

292001–292100 

|-bgcolor=#d6d6d6
| 292001 ||  || — || August 27, 2006 || Anderson Mesa || LONEOS || — || align=right | 2.2 km || 
|-id=002 bgcolor=#fefefe
| 292002 ||  || — || August 27, 2006 || Anderson Mesa || LONEOS || NYS || align=right data-sort-value="0.95" | 950 m || 
|-id=003 bgcolor=#E9E9E9
| 292003 ||  || — || August 27, 2006 || Anderson Mesa || LONEOS || — || align=right | 2.7 km || 
|-id=004 bgcolor=#fefefe
| 292004 ||  || — || August 29, 2006 || Catalina || CSS || V || align=right data-sort-value="0.86" | 860 m || 
|-id=005 bgcolor=#fefefe
| 292005 ||  || — || August 29, 2006 || Catalina || CSS || — || align=right data-sort-value="0.85" | 850 m || 
|-id=006 bgcolor=#E9E9E9
| 292006 ||  || — || August 29, 2006 || Catalina || CSS || — || align=right | 2.5 km || 
|-id=007 bgcolor=#fefefe
| 292007 ||  || — || August 16, 2006 || Palomar || NEAT || — || align=right | 1.2 km || 
|-id=008 bgcolor=#E9E9E9
| 292008 ||  || — || August 17, 2006 || Palomar || NEAT || — || align=right | 2.0 km || 
|-id=009 bgcolor=#fefefe
| 292009 ||  || — || August 18, 2006 || Anderson Mesa || LONEOS || — || align=right | 1.4 km || 
|-id=010 bgcolor=#E9E9E9
| 292010 ||  || — || August 22, 2006 || Palomar || NEAT || — || align=right | 1.1 km || 
|-id=011 bgcolor=#fefefe
| 292011 ||  || — || August 23, 2006 || Palomar || NEAT || — || align=right data-sort-value="0.96" | 960 m || 
|-id=012 bgcolor=#fefefe
| 292012 ||  || — || August 29, 2006 || Catalina || CSS || FLO || align=right data-sort-value="0.64" | 640 m || 
|-id=013 bgcolor=#E9E9E9
| 292013 ||  || — || August 29, 2006 || Catalina || CSS || MAR || align=right | 1.2 km || 
|-id=014 bgcolor=#fefefe
| 292014 ||  || — || August 26, 2006 || Reedy Creek || J. Broughton || — || align=right | 1.0 km || 
|-id=015 bgcolor=#d6d6d6
| 292015 ||  || — || August 18, 2006 || Kitt Peak || Spacewatch || THM || align=right | 2.5 km || 
|-id=016 bgcolor=#E9E9E9
| 292016 ||  || — || August 18, 2006 || Kitt Peak || Spacewatch || — || align=right data-sort-value="0.89" | 890 m || 
|-id=017 bgcolor=#E9E9E9
| 292017 ||  || — || August 18, 2006 || Kitt Peak || Spacewatch || — || align=right data-sort-value="0.91" | 910 m || 
|-id=018 bgcolor=#d6d6d6
| 292018 ||  || — || August 18, 2006 || Kitt Peak || Spacewatch || — || align=right | 3.6 km || 
|-id=019 bgcolor=#d6d6d6
| 292019 ||  || — || August 18, 2006 || Kitt Peak || Spacewatch || — || align=right | 3.4 km || 
|-id=020 bgcolor=#fefefe
| 292020 ||  || — || August 19, 2006 || Kitt Peak || Spacewatch || — || align=right data-sort-value="0.74" | 740 m || 
|-id=021 bgcolor=#d6d6d6
| 292021 ||  || — || August 19, 2006 || Kitt Peak || Spacewatch || KOR || align=right | 1.8 km || 
|-id=022 bgcolor=#E9E9E9
| 292022 ||  || — || August 19, 2006 || Kitt Peak || Spacewatch || AST || align=right | 2.0 km || 
|-id=023 bgcolor=#E9E9E9
| 292023 ||  || — || August 18, 2006 || Palomar || NEAT || EUN || align=right | 1.4 km || 
|-id=024 bgcolor=#fefefe
| 292024 ||  || — || August 19, 2006 || Kitt Peak || Spacewatch || — || align=right data-sort-value="0.74" | 740 m || 
|-id=025 bgcolor=#d6d6d6
| 292025 ||  || — || August 19, 2006 || Kitt Peak || Spacewatch || — || align=right | 4.1 km || 
|-id=026 bgcolor=#fefefe
| 292026 ||  || — || August 19, 2006 || Kitt Peak || Spacewatch || — || align=right data-sort-value="0.84" | 840 m || 
|-id=027 bgcolor=#d6d6d6
| 292027 ||  || — || August 19, 2006 || Kitt Peak || Spacewatch || — || align=right | 3.2 km || 
|-id=028 bgcolor=#fefefe
| 292028 ||  || — || August 21, 2006 || Kitt Peak || Spacewatch || V || align=right data-sort-value="0.70" | 700 m || 
|-id=029 bgcolor=#E9E9E9
| 292029 ||  || — || August 29, 2006 || Catalina || CSS || — || align=right | 2.0 km || 
|-id=030 bgcolor=#E9E9E9
| 292030 ||  || — || August 29, 2006 || Catalina || CSS || — || align=right | 3.3 km || 
|-id=031 bgcolor=#d6d6d6
| 292031 ||  || — || October 15, 2001 || Kitt Peak || Spacewatch || EOS || align=right | 2.3 km || 
|-id=032 bgcolor=#E9E9E9
| 292032 ||  || — || August 30, 2006 || Anderson Mesa || LONEOS || — || align=right | 2.7 km || 
|-id=033 bgcolor=#fefefe
| 292033 ||  || — || August 30, 2006 || Anderson Mesa || LONEOS || — || align=right | 2.1 km || 
|-id=034 bgcolor=#d6d6d6
| 292034 ||  || — || August 30, 2006 || Anderson Mesa || LONEOS || MEL || align=right | 4.3 km || 
|-id=035 bgcolor=#E9E9E9
| 292035 ||  || — || August 30, 2006 || Anderson Mesa || LONEOS || — || align=right | 2.6 km || 
|-id=036 bgcolor=#d6d6d6
| 292036 ||  || — || August 27, 2006 || Anderson Mesa || LONEOS || — || align=right | 6.2 km || 
|-id=037 bgcolor=#E9E9E9
| 292037 ||  || — || August 22, 2006 || Cerro Tololo || M. W. Buie || BRG || align=right | 1.5 km || 
|-id=038 bgcolor=#d6d6d6
| 292038 ||  || — || August 21, 2006 || Kitt Peak || Spacewatch || — || align=right | 4.3 km || 
|-id=039 bgcolor=#d6d6d6
| 292039 ||  || — || August 28, 2006 || Apache Point || A. C. Becker || EOS || align=right | 3.8 km || 
|-id=040 bgcolor=#E9E9E9
| 292040 ||  || — || August 19, 2006 || Kitt Peak || Spacewatch || HEN || align=right | 1.4 km || 
|-id=041 bgcolor=#E9E9E9
| 292041 ||  || — || August 28, 2006 || Kitt Peak || Spacewatch || — || align=right data-sort-value="0.90" | 900 m || 
|-id=042 bgcolor=#d6d6d6
| 292042 ||  || — || August 28, 2006 || Kitt Peak || Spacewatch || KOR || align=right | 1.6 km || 
|-id=043 bgcolor=#E9E9E9
| 292043 ||  || — || August 28, 2006 || Catalina || CSS || — || align=right | 1.1 km || 
|-id=044 bgcolor=#d6d6d6
| 292044 ||  || — || August 18, 2006 || Kitt Peak || Spacewatch || — || align=right | 3.0 km || 
|-id=045 bgcolor=#d6d6d6
| 292045 ||  || — || August 18, 2006 || Kitt Peak || Spacewatch || — || align=right | 3.0 km || 
|-id=046 bgcolor=#E9E9E9
| 292046 ||  || — || August 28, 2006 || Kitt Peak || Spacewatch || — || align=right | 1.3 km || 
|-id=047 bgcolor=#fefefe
| 292047 ||  || — || August 28, 2006 || Catalina || CSS || NYS || align=right data-sort-value="0.79" | 790 m || 
|-id=048 bgcolor=#E9E9E9
| 292048 ||  || — || August 29, 2006 || Kitt Peak || Spacewatch || — || align=right | 1.4 km || 
|-id=049 bgcolor=#fefefe
| 292049 ||  || — || August 29, 2006 || Kitt Peak || Spacewatch || V || align=right data-sort-value="0.76" | 760 m || 
|-id=050 bgcolor=#fefefe
| 292050 ||  || — || September 13, 2006 || Eskridge || Farpoint Obs. || FLO || align=right | 1.1 km || 
|-id=051 bgcolor=#d6d6d6
| 292051 Bohlender ||  ||  || September 14, 2006 || Mauna Kea || D. D. Balam || — || align=right | 3.4 km || 
|-id=052 bgcolor=#fefefe
| 292052 ||  || — || September 12, 2006 || Catalina || CSS || NYS || align=right data-sort-value="0.79" | 790 m || 
|-id=053 bgcolor=#E9E9E9
| 292053 ||  || — || September 14, 2006 || Catalina || CSS || INO || align=right | 1.6 km || 
|-id=054 bgcolor=#E9E9E9
| 292054 ||  || — || September 14, 2006 || Catalina || CSS || — || align=right | 1.9 km || 
|-id=055 bgcolor=#d6d6d6
| 292055 ||  || — || September 14, 2006 || Catalina || CSS || — || align=right | 4.4 km || 
|-id=056 bgcolor=#fefefe
| 292056 ||  || — || September 14, 2006 || Catalina || CSS || — || align=right data-sort-value="0.91" | 910 m || 
|-id=057 bgcolor=#fefefe
| 292057 ||  || — || September 12, 2006 || Catalina || CSS || — || align=right data-sort-value="0.83" | 830 m || 
|-id=058 bgcolor=#E9E9E9
| 292058 ||  || — || September 12, 2006 || Catalina || CSS || — || align=right | 1.8 km || 
|-id=059 bgcolor=#d6d6d6
| 292059 ||  || — || September 13, 2006 || Palomar || NEAT || EOS || align=right | 2.7 km || 
|-id=060 bgcolor=#E9E9E9
| 292060 ||  || — || September 13, 2006 || Palomar || NEAT || — || align=right | 3.5 km || 
|-id=061 bgcolor=#d6d6d6
| 292061 ||  || — || September 13, 2006 || Palomar || NEAT || — || align=right | 4.9 km || 
|-id=062 bgcolor=#fefefe
| 292062 ||  || — || September 12, 2006 || Catalina || CSS || FLO || align=right data-sort-value="0.69" | 690 m || 
|-id=063 bgcolor=#E9E9E9
| 292063 ||  || — || September 13, 2006 || Palomar || NEAT || — || align=right | 1.6 km || 
|-id=064 bgcolor=#fefefe
| 292064 ||  || — || September 14, 2006 || Kitt Peak || Spacewatch || — || align=right data-sort-value="0.99" | 990 m || 
|-id=065 bgcolor=#fefefe
| 292065 ||  || — || September 14, 2006 || Kitt Peak || Spacewatch || — || align=right data-sort-value="0.96" | 960 m || 
|-id=066 bgcolor=#fefefe
| 292066 ||  || — || September 14, 2006 || Kitt Peak || Spacewatch || — || align=right data-sort-value="0.99" | 990 m || 
|-id=067 bgcolor=#fefefe
| 292067 ||  || — || September 14, 2006 || Palomar || NEAT || — || align=right | 1.0 km || 
|-id=068 bgcolor=#E9E9E9
| 292068 ||  || — || September 14, 2006 || Catalina || CSS || — || align=right | 1.7 km || 
|-id=069 bgcolor=#E9E9E9
| 292069 ||  || — || September 14, 2006 || Catalina || CSS || — || align=right | 3.3 km || 
|-id=070 bgcolor=#fefefe
| 292070 ||  || — || September 14, 2006 || Kitt Peak || Spacewatch || — || align=right data-sort-value="0.89" | 890 m || 
|-id=071 bgcolor=#fefefe
| 292071 ||  || — || September 14, 2006 || Catalina || CSS || — || align=right data-sort-value="0.82" | 820 m || 
|-id=072 bgcolor=#fefefe
| 292072 ||  || — || September 14, 2006 || Palomar || NEAT || — || align=right | 1.1 km || 
|-id=073 bgcolor=#d6d6d6
| 292073 ||  || — || September 15, 2006 || Kitt Peak || Spacewatch || VER || align=right | 2.9 km || 
|-id=074 bgcolor=#d6d6d6
| 292074 ||  || — || September 15, 2006 || Kitt Peak || Spacewatch || KOR || align=right | 1.5 km || 
|-id=075 bgcolor=#E9E9E9
| 292075 ||  || — || September 15, 2006 || Kitt Peak || Spacewatch || — || align=right | 3.3 km || 
|-id=076 bgcolor=#d6d6d6
| 292076 ||  || — || September 15, 2006 || Kitt Peak || Spacewatch || — || align=right | 3.7 km || 
|-id=077 bgcolor=#fefefe
| 292077 ||  || — || September 13, 2006 || Palomar || NEAT || — || align=right | 1.1 km || 
|-id=078 bgcolor=#fefefe
| 292078 ||  || — || September 14, 2006 || Palomar || NEAT || FLO || align=right data-sort-value="0.79" | 790 m || 
|-id=079 bgcolor=#E9E9E9
| 292079 ||  || — || September 14, 2006 || Kitt Peak || Spacewatch || — || align=right | 1.6 km || 
|-id=080 bgcolor=#E9E9E9
| 292080 ||  || — || September 15, 2006 || Kitt Peak || Spacewatch || — || align=right | 1.1 km || 
|-id=081 bgcolor=#E9E9E9
| 292081 ||  || — || September 12, 2006 || Catalina || CSS || — || align=right | 1.3 km || 
|-id=082 bgcolor=#E9E9E9
| 292082 ||  || — || September 12, 2006 || Catalina || CSS || — || align=right | 2.1 km || 
|-id=083 bgcolor=#E9E9E9
| 292083 ||  || — || September 12, 2006 || Catalina || CSS || — || align=right | 1.8 km || 
|-id=084 bgcolor=#d6d6d6
| 292084 ||  || — || September 12, 2006 || Catalina || CSS || — || align=right | 4.7 km || 
|-id=085 bgcolor=#d6d6d6
| 292085 ||  || — || September 13, 2006 || Palomar || NEAT || — || align=right | 3.4 km || 
|-id=086 bgcolor=#d6d6d6
| 292086 ||  || — || September 13, 2006 || Palomar || NEAT || — || align=right | 3.9 km || 
|-id=087 bgcolor=#fefefe
| 292087 ||  || — || September 14, 2006 || Palomar || NEAT || FLO || align=right data-sort-value="0.83" | 830 m || 
|-id=088 bgcolor=#fefefe
| 292088 ||  || — || September 14, 2006 || Palomar || NEAT || H || align=right data-sort-value="0.92" | 920 m || 
|-id=089 bgcolor=#d6d6d6
| 292089 ||  || — || September 14, 2006 || Palomar || NEAT || — || align=right | 4.5 km || 
|-id=090 bgcolor=#E9E9E9
| 292090 ||  || — || September 14, 2006 || Palomar || NEAT || — || align=right | 1.7 km || 
|-id=091 bgcolor=#E9E9E9
| 292091 ||  || — || September 12, 2006 || Catalina || CSS || — || align=right | 3.3 km || 
|-id=092 bgcolor=#d6d6d6
| 292092 ||  || — || September 12, 2006 || Catalina || CSS || — || align=right | 2.9 km || 
|-id=093 bgcolor=#E9E9E9
| 292093 ||  || — || September 12, 2006 || Catalina || CSS || MRX || align=right | 1.6 km || 
|-id=094 bgcolor=#E9E9E9
| 292094 ||  || — || September 14, 2006 || Kitt Peak || Spacewatch || — || align=right | 1.5 km || 
|-id=095 bgcolor=#E9E9E9
| 292095 ||  || — || September 14, 2006 || Kitt Peak || Spacewatch || — || align=right | 1.9 km || 
|-id=096 bgcolor=#d6d6d6
| 292096 ||  || — || September 14, 2006 || Kitt Peak || Spacewatch || — || align=right | 2.9 km || 
|-id=097 bgcolor=#d6d6d6
| 292097 ||  || — || September 14, 2006 || Kitt Peak || Spacewatch || — || align=right | 3.4 km || 
|-id=098 bgcolor=#E9E9E9
| 292098 ||  || — || September 14, 2006 || Kitt Peak || Spacewatch || — || align=right | 2.3 km || 
|-id=099 bgcolor=#fefefe
| 292099 ||  || — || September 14, 2006 || Kitt Peak || Spacewatch || MAS || align=right data-sort-value="0.82" | 820 m || 
|-id=100 bgcolor=#d6d6d6
| 292100 ||  || — || September 14, 2006 || Catalina || CSS || MEL || align=right | 4.2 km || 
|}

292101–292200 

|-bgcolor=#fefefe
| 292101 ||  || — || September 14, 2006 || Kitt Peak || Spacewatch || — || align=right data-sort-value="0.74" | 740 m || 
|-id=102 bgcolor=#fefefe
| 292102 ||  || — || September 14, 2006 || Kitt Peak || Spacewatch || — || align=right data-sort-value="0.89" | 890 m || 
|-id=103 bgcolor=#d6d6d6
| 292103 ||  || — || September 14, 2006 || Kitt Peak || Spacewatch || — || align=right | 3.3 km || 
|-id=104 bgcolor=#E9E9E9
| 292104 ||  || — || September 14, 2006 || Kitt Peak || Spacewatch || MIS || align=right | 2.0 km || 
|-id=105 bgcolor=#fefefe
| 292105 ||  || — || September 14, 2006 || Kitt Peak || Spacewatch || MAS || align=right data-sort-value="0.79" | 790 m || 
|-id=106 bgcolor=#d6d6d6
| 292106 ||  || — || September 14, 2006 || Kitt Peak || Spacewatch || — || align=right | 2.8 km || 
|-id=107 bgcolor=#d6d6d6
| 292107 ||  || — || September 14, 2006 || Kitt Peak || Spacewatch || EOS || align=right | 2.3 km || 
|-id=108 bgcolor=#fefefe
| 292108 ||  || — || September 14, 2006 || Kitt Peak || Spacewatch || NYS || align=right data-sort-value="0.80" | 800 m || 
|-id=109 bgcolor=#d6d6d6
| 292109 ||  || — || September 14, 2006 || Kitt Peak || Spacewatch || KOR || align=right | 2.0 km || 
|-id=110 bgcolor=#fefefe
| 292110 ||  || — || September 14, 2006 || Kitt Peak || Spacewatch || NYS || align=right data-sort-value="0.70" | 700 m || 
|-id=111 bgcolor=#E9E9E9
| 292111 ||  || — || September 14, 2006 || Kitt Peak || Spacewatch || — || align=right | 1.5 km || 
|-id=112 bgcolor=#E9E9E9
| 292112 ||  || — || September 15, 2006 || Kitt Peak || Spacewatch || — || align=right | 1.1 km || 
|-id=113 bgcolor=#d6d6d6
| 292113 ||  || — || September 15, 2006 || Kitt Peak || Spacewatch || — || align=right | 5.2 km || 
|-id=114 bgcolor=#d6d6d6
| 292114 ||  || — || September 15, 2006 || Kitt Peak || Spacewatch || — || align=right | 4.7 km || 
|-id=115 bgcolor=#d6d6d6
| 292115 ||  || — || September 15, 2006 || Kitt Peak || Spacewatch || — || align=right | 3.4 km || 
|-id=116 bgcolor=#E9E9E9
| 292116 ||  || — || September 15, 2006 || Kitt Peak || Spacewatch || HOF || align=right | 3.0 km || 
|-id=117 bgcolor=#E9E9E9
| 292117 ||  || — || September 13, 2006 || Palomar || NEAT || — || align=right | 2.4 km || 
|-id=118 bgcolor=#E9E9E9
| 292118 ||  || — || September 14, 2006 || Catalina || CSS || GER || align=right | 1.7 km || 
|-id=119 bgcolor=#E9E9E9
| 292119 ||  || — || September 12, 2006 || Catalina || CSS || — || align=right | 2.9 km || 
|-id=120 bgcolor=#E9E9E9
| 292120 ||  || — || September 13, 2006 || Palomar || NEAT || — || align=right | 2.3 km || 
|-id=121 bgcolor=#fefefe
| 292121 ||  || — || September 14, 2006 || Kitt Peak || Spacewatch || — || align=right data-sort-value="0.81" | 810 m || 
|-id=122 bgcolor=#E9E9E9
| 292122 ||  || — || September 15, 2006 || Kitt Peak || Spacewatch || HNS || align=right | 1.1 km || 
|-id=123 bgcolor=#d6d6d6
| 292123 ||  || — || September 15, 2006 || Kitt Peak || Spacewatch || KOR || align=right | 1.7 km || 
|-id=124 bgcolor=#d6d6d6
| 292124 ||  || — || September 15, 2006 || Kitt Peak || Spacewatch || KOR || align=right | 1.5 km || 
|-id=125 bgcolor=#d6d6d6
| 292125 ||  || — || September 15, 2006 || Kitt Peak || Spacewatch || VER || align=right | 3.0 km || 
|-id=126 bgcolor=#d6d6d6
| 292126 ||  || — || September 15, 2006 || Kitt Peak || Spacewatch || THM || align=right | 3.1 km || 
|-id=127 bgcolor=#E9E9E9
| 292127 ||  || — || September 15, 2006 || Kitt Peak || Spacewatch || — || align=right | 2.3 km || 
|-id=128 bgcolor=#d6d6d6
| 292128 ||  || — || September 15, 2006 || Kitt Peak || Spacewatch || — || align=right | 3.0 km || 
|-id=129 bgcolor=#E9E9E9
| 292129 ||  || — || September 15, 2006 || Kitt Peak || Spacewatch || — || align=right | 2.1 km || 
|-id=130 bgcolor=#d6d6d6
| 292130 ||  || — || September 15, 2006 || Kitt Peak || Spacewatch || — || align=right | 2.3 km || 
|-id=131 bgcolor=#d6d6d6
| 292131 ||  || — || September 15, 2006 || Kitt Peak || Spacewatch || — || align=right | 2.8 km || 
|-id=132 bgcolor=#E9E9E9
| 292132 ||  || — || September 15, 2006 || Kitt Peak || Spacewatch || HEN || align=right | 1.2 km || 
|-id=133 bgcolor=#d6d6d6
| 292133 ||  || — || September 15, 2006 || Kitt Peak || Spacewatch || — || align=right | 3.4 km || 
|-id=134 bgcolor=#E9E9E9
| 292134 ||  || — || September 15, 2006 || Kitt Peak || Spacewatch || — || align=right | 2.7 km || 
|-id=135 bgcolor=#E9E9E9
| 292135 ||  || — || September 15, 2006 || Kitt Peak || Spacewatch || — || align=right | 1.4 km || 
|-id=136 bgcolor=#d6d6d6
| 292136 ||  || — || September 15, 2006 || Kitt Peak || Spacewatch || CHA || align=right | 2.2 km || 
|-id=137 bgcolor=#fefefe
| 292137 ||  || — || September 15, 2006 || Kitt Peak || Spacewatch || — || align=right data-sort-value="0.90" | 900 m || 
|-id=138 bgcolor=#fefefe
| 292138 ||  || — || September 15, 2006 || Kitt Peak || Spacewatch || V || align=right data-sort-value="0.78" | 780 m || 
|-id=139 bgcolor=#d6d6d6
| 292139 ||  || — || September 15, 2006 || Kitt Peak || Spacewatch || KOR || align=right | 1.7 km || 
|-id=140 bgcolor=#d6d6d6
| 292140 ||  || — || September 15, 2006 || Kitt Peak || Spacewatch || — || align=right | 3.7 km || 
|-id=141 bgcolor=#d6d6d6
| 292141 ||  || — || September 15, 2006 || Kitt Peak || Spacewatch || — || align=right | 3.2 km || 
|-id=142 bgcolor=#fefefe
| 292142 ||  || — || September 15, 2006 || Kitt Peak || Spacewatch || — || align=right data-sort-value="0.60" | 600 m || 
|-id=143 bgcolor=#d6d6d6
| 292143 ||  || — || September 15, 2006 || Kitt Peak || Spacewatch || HYG || align=right | 2.6 km || 
|-id=144 bgcolor=#fefefe
| 292144 ||  || — || September 15, 2006 || Kitt Peak || Spacewatch || MAS || align=right data-sort-value="0.63" | 630 m || 
|-id=145 bgcolor=#E9E9E9
| 292145 ||  || — || September 15, 2006 || Kitt Peak || Spacewatch || — || align=right | 1.0 km || 
|-id=146 bgcolor=#fefefe
| 292146 ||  || — || September 15, 2006 || Kitt Peak || Spacewatch || NYS || align=right data-sort-value="0.82" | 820 m || 
|-id=147 bgcolor=#E9E9E9
| 292147 ||  || — || September 15, 2006 || Kitt Peak || Spacewatch || NEM || align=right | 2.7 km || 
|-id=148 bgcolor=#E9E9E9
| 292148 ||  || — || September 15, 2006 || Kitt Peak || Spacewatch || — || align=right | 1.7 km || 
|-id=149 bgcolor=#E9E9E9
| 292149 ||  || — || September 15, 2006 || Kitt Peak || Spacewatch || — || align=right data-sort-value="0.97" | 970 m || 
|-id=150 bgcolor=#d6d6d6
| 292150 ||  || — || September 15, 2006 || Kitt Peak || Spacewatch || HYG || align=right | 4.0 km || 
|-id=151 bgcolor=#d6d6d6
| 292151 ||  || — || September 15, 2006 || Kitt Peak || Spacewatch || KOR || align=right | 1.5 km || 
|-id=152 bgcolor=#E9E9E9
| 292152 ||  || — || September 15, 2006 || Kitt Peak || Spacewatch || — || align=right | 1.2 km || 
|-id=153 bgcolor=#d6d6d6
| 292153 ||  || — || September 13, 2006 || Palomar || NEAT || — || align=right | 2.8 km || 
|-id=154 bgcolor=#E9E9E9
| 292154 ||  || — || September 14, 2006 || Catalina || CSS || — || align=right | 1.8 km || 
|-id=155 bgcolor=#d6d6d6
| 292155 ||  || — || September 14, 2006 || Catalina || CSS || EOS || align=right | 2.5 km || 
|-id=156 bgcolor=#d6d6d6
| 292156 ||  || — || September 15, 2006 || Kitt Peak || Spacewatch || — || align=right | 2.2 km || 
|-id=157 bgcolor=#d6d6d6
| 292157 ||  || — || September 11, 2006 || Apache Point || A. C. Becker || — || align=right | 4.6 km || 
|-id=158 bgcolor=#d6d6d6
| 292158 ||  || — || September 11, 2006 || Apache Point || A. C. Becker || — || align=right | 2.6 km || 
|-id=159 bgcolor=#fefefe
| 292159 Jongoldstein ||  ||  || September 14, 2006 || Mauna Kea || J. Masiero || NYS || align=right data-sort-value="0.70" | 700 m || 
|-id=160 bgcolor=#E9E9E9
| 292160 Davefask ||  ||  || September 14, 2006 || Mauna Kea || J. Masiero || — || align=right | 1.2 km || 
|-id=161 bgcolor=#E9E9E9
| 292161 ||  || — || September 15, 2006 || Kitt Peak || Spacewatch || RAF || align=right | 1.0 km || 
|-id=162 bgcolor=#d6d6d6
| 292162 ||  || — || September 16, 2006 || Catalina || CSS || EOS || align=right | 2.6 km || 
|-id=163 bgcolor=#fefefe
| 292163 ||  || — || September 16, 2006 || Socorro || LINEAR || — || align=right | 1.1 km || 
|-id=164 bgcolor=#d6d6d6
| 292164 ||  || — || September 16, 2006 || Catalina || CSS || EOS || align=right | 2.9 km || 
|-id=165 bgcolor=#FFC2E0
| 292165 ||  || — || September 16, 2006 || Siding Spring || SSS || APO +1km || align=right data-sort-value="0.80" | 800 m || 
|-id=166 bgcolor=#fefefe
| 292166 ||  || — || September 16, 2006 || Socorro || LINEAR || NYS || align=right data-sort-value="0.87" | 870 m || 
|-id=167 bgcolor=#fefefe
| 292167 ||  || — || September 16, 2006 || Catalina || CSS || V || align=right data-sort-value="0.89" | 890 m || 
|-id=168 bgcolor=#E9E9E9
| 292168 ||  || — || September 16, 2006 || Kitt Peak || Spacewatch || — || align=right | 1.0 km || 
|-id=169 bgcolor=#E9E9E9
| 292169 ||  || — || September 16, 2006 || Catalina || CSS || — || align=right | 2.0 km || 
|-id=170 bgcolor=#E9E9E9
| 292170 ||  || — || September 16, 2006 || Socorro || LINEAR || — || align=right | 3.3 km || 
|-id=171 bgcolor=#fefefe
| 292171 ||  || — || September 16, 2006 || Palomar || NEAT || FLO || align=right data-sort-value="0.75" | 750 m || 
|-id=172 bgcolor=#E9E9E9
| 292172 ||  || — || September 16, 2006 || Palomar || NEAT || — || align=right | 3.0 km || 
|-id=173 bgcolor=#d6d6d6
| 292173 ||  || — || September 17, 2006 || Socorro || LINEAR || — || align=right | 3.1 km || 
|-id=174 bgcolor=#fefefe
| 292174 ||  || — || September 17, 2006 || Catalina || CSS || — || align=right | 1.0 km || 
|-id=175 bgcolor=#d6d6d6
| 292175 ||  || — || September 17, 2006 || Catalina || CSS || — || align=right | 3.7 km || 
|-id=176 bgcolor=#E9E9E9
| 292176 ||  || — || September 17, 2006 || Catalina || CSS || — || align=right | 2.6 km || 
|-id=177 bgcolor=#E9E9E9
| 292177 ||  || — || September 17, 2006 || Kitt Peak || Spacewatch || NEM || align=right | 2.7 km || 
|-id=178 bgcolor=#fefefe
| 292178 ||  || — || September 17, 2006 || Kitt Peak || Spacewatch || — || align=right | 1.1 km || 
|-id=179 bgcolor=#E9E9E9
| 292179 ||  || — || September 17, 2006 || Kitt Peak || Spacewatch || — || align=right | 3.5 km || 
|-id=180 bgcolor=#fefefe
| 292180 ||  || — || September 17, 2006 || Kitt Peak || Spacewatch || NYS || align=right data-sort-value="0.67" | 670 m || 
|-id=181 bgcolor=#d6d6d6
| 292181 ||  || — || September 19, 2006 || La Sagra || OAM Obs. || EOS || align=right | 2.6 km || 
|-id=182 bgcolor=#fefefe
| 292182 ||  || — || September 18, 2006 || Calvin-Rehoboth || Calvin–Rehoboth Obs. || — || align=right data-sort-value="0.68" | 680 m || 
|-id=183 bgcolor=#E9E9E9
| 292183 ||  || — || September 19, 2006 || Eskridge || Farpoint Obs. || — || align=right | 2.6 km || 
|-id=184 bgcolor=#d6d6d6
| 292184 ||  || — || September 17, 2006 || Catalina || CSS || NAE || align=right | 4.8 km || 
|-id=185 bgcolor=#d6d6d6
| 292185 ||  || — || September 17, 2006 || Catalina || CSS || — || align=right | 3.1 km || 
|-id=186 bgcolor=#E9E9E9
| 292186 ||  || — || September 17, 2006 || Anderson Mesa || LONEOS || — || align=right | 2.9 km || 
|-id=187 bgcolor=#E9E9E9
| 292187 ||  || — || September 16, 2006 || Anderson Mesa || LONEOS || — || align=right | 1.5 km || 
|-id=188 bgcolor=#fefefe
| 292188 ||  || — || September 17, 2006 || Kitt Peak || Spacewatch || ERI || align=right | 1.4 km || 
|-id=189 bgcolor=#d6d6d6
| 292189 ||  || — || September 17, 2006 || Kitt Peak || Spacewatch || EOS || align=right | 2.1 km || 
|-id=190 bgcolor=#fefefe
| 292190 ||  || — || September 17, 2006 || Kitt Peak || Spacewatch || — || align=right data-sort-value="0.68" | 680 m || 
|-id=191 bgcolor=#fefefe
| 292191 ||  || — || September 17, 2006 || Socorro || LINEAR || NYS || align=right data-sort-value="0.91" | 910 m || 
|-id=192 bgcolor=#d6d6d6
| 292192 ||  || — || September 17, 2006 || Kitt Peak || Spacewatch || — || align=right | 2.3 km || 
|-id=193 bgcolor=#fefefe
| 292193 ||  || — || September 17, 2006 || Kitt Peak || Spacewatch || — || align=right data-sort-value="0.91" | 910 m || 
|-id=194 bgcolor=#fefefe
| 292194 ||  || — || September 17, 2006 || Kitt Peak || Spacewatch || NYS || align=right data-sort-value="0.73" | 730 m || 
|-id=195 bgcolor=#d6d6d6
| 292195 ||  || — || September 17, 2006 || Catalina || CSS || — || align=right | 2.9 km || 
|-id=196 bgcolor=#fefefe
| 292196 ||  || — || September 17, 2006 || Catalina || CSS || — || align=right data-sort-value="0.85" | 850 m || 
|-id=197 bgcolor=#d6d6d6
| 292197 ||  || — || September 17, 2006 || Catalina || CSS || — || align=right | 4.5 km || 
|-id=198 bgcolor=#E9E9E9
| 292198 ||  || — || September 17, 2006 || Catalina || CSS || — || align=right | 1.8 km || 
|-id=199 bgcolor=#E9E9E9
| 292199 ||  || — || September 17, 2006 || Catalina || CSS || WIT || align=right | 1.3 km || 
|-id=200 bgcolor=#fefefe
| 292200 ||  || — || September 17, 2006 || Catalina || CSS || NYS || align=right data-sort-value="0.92" | 920 m || 
|}

292201–292300 

|-bgcolor=#E9E9E9
| 292201 ||  || — || September 17, 2006 || Kitt Peak || Spacewatch || HOF || align=right | 4.1 km || 
|-id=202 bgcolor=#E9E9E9
| 292202 ||  || — || September 17, 2006 || Kitt Peak || Spacewatch || — || align=right | 1.5 km || 
|-id=203 bgcolor=#E9E9E9
| 292203 ||  || — || September 17, 2006 || Kitt Peak || Spacewatch || PAD || align=right | 2.1 km || 
|-id=204 bgcolor=#E9E9E9
| 292204 ||  || — || September 17, 2006 || Kitt Peak || Spacewatch || — || align=right | 2.7 km || 
|-id=205 bgcolor=#fefefe
| 292205 ||  || — || September 17, 2006 || Anderson Mesa || LONEOS || V || align=right data-sort-value="0.86" | 860 m || 
|-id=206 bgcolor=#E9E9E9
| 292206 ||  || — || September 17, 2006 || Kitt Peak || Spacewatch || HOF || align=right | 3.1 km || 
|-id=207 bgcolor=#fefefe
| 292207 ||  || — || September 17, 2006 || Anderson Mesa || LONEOS || — || align=right data-sort-value="0.97" | 970 m || 
|-id=208 bgcolor=#d6d6d6
| 292208 ||  || — || September 17, 2006 || Kitt Peak || Spacewatch || — || align=right | 3.9 km || 
|-id=209 bgcolor=#E9E9E9
| 292209 ||  || — || September 17, 2006 || Kitt Peak || Spacewatch || — || align=right | 1.7 km || 
|-id=210 bgcolor=#d6d6d6
| 292210 ||  || — || September 18, 2006 || Kitt Peak || Spacewatch || HYG || align=right | 2.8 km || 
|-id=211 bgcolor=#fefefe
| 292211 ||  || — || September 18, 2006 || Anderson Mesa || LONEOS || V || align=right data-sort-value="0.96" | 960 m || 
|-id=212 bgcolor=#fefefe
| 292212 ||  || — || September 18, 2006 || Kitt Peak || Spacewatch || MAS || align=right data-sort-value="0.65" | 650 m || 
|-id=213 bgcolor=#d6d6d6
| 292213 ||  || — || September 18, 2006 || Catalina || CSS || — || align=right | 4.0 km || 
|-id=214 bgcolor=#E9E9E9
| 292214 ||  || — || September 16, 2006 || Catalina || CSS || — || align=right | 2.5 km || 
|-id=215 bgcolor=#E9E9E9
| 292215 ||  || — || September 18, 2006 || Anderson Mesa || LONEOS || — || align=right | 1.5 km || 
|-id=216 bgcolor=#fefefe
| 292216 ||  || — || September 18, 2006 || Kitt Peak || Spacewatch || — || align=right data-sort-value="0.87" | 870 m || 
|-id=217 bgcolor=#d6d6d6
| 292217 ||  || — || September 19, 2006 || Kitt Peak || Spacewatch || KOR || align=right | 1.5 km || 
|-id=218 bgcolor=#fefefe
| 292218 ||  || — || September 18, 2006 || Kitt Peak || Spacewatch || NYS || align=right data-sort-value="0.83" | 830 m || 
|-id=219 bgcolor=#fefefe
| 292219 ||  || — || September 19, 2006 || Anderson Mesa || LONEOS || NYS || align=right data-sort-value="0.94" | 940 m || 
|-id=220 bgcolor=#FFC2E0
| 292220 ||  || — || September 20, 2006 || Kitt Peak || Spacewatch || APOPHA || align=right data-sort-value="0.45" | 450 m || 
|-id=221 bgcolor=#E9E9E9
| 292221 ||  || — || September 16, 2006 || Catalina || CSS || — || align=right | 2.3 km || 
|-id=222 bgcolor=#fefefe
| 292222 ||  || — || September 17, 2006 || Anderson Mesa || LONEOS || V || align=right data-sort-value="0.73" | 730 m || 
|-id=223 bgcolor=#d6d6d6
| 292223 ||  || — || September 17, 2006 || Anderson Mesa || LONEOS || EOS || align=right | 2.9 km || 
|-id=224 bgcolor=#d6d6d6
| 292224 ||  || — || September 16, 2006 || Catalina || CSS || — || align=right | 3.4 km || 
|-id=225 bgcolor=#fefefe
| 292225 ||  || — || September 18, 2006 || Catalina || CSS || FLO || align=right data-sort-value="0.78" | 780 m || 
|-id=226 bgcolor=#E9E9E9
| 292226 ||  || — || September 18, 2006 || Calvin-Rehoboth || Calvin–Rehoboth Obs. || HOF || align=right | 2.4 km || 
|-id=227 bgcolor=#FA8072
| 292227 ||  || — || September 17, 2006 || Catalina || CSS || — || align=right | 1.5 km || 
|-id=228 bgcolor=#d6d6d6
| 292228 ||  || — || September 18, 2006 || Catalina || CSS || — || align=right | 4.1 km || 
|-id=229 bgcolor=#fefefe
| 292229 ||  || — || September 18, 2006 || Catalina || CSS || — || align=right | 1.0 km || 
|-id=230 bgcolor=#E9E9E9
| 292230 ||  || — || September 18, 2006 || Catalina || CSS || — || align=right | 3.2 km || 
|-id=231 bgcolor=#d6d6d6
| 292231 ||  || — || September 18, 2006 || Catalina || CSS || — || align=right | 2.9 km || 
|-id=232 bgcolor=#fefefe
| 292232 ||  || — || September 18, 2006 || Anderson Mesa || LONEOS || V || align=right data-sort-value="0.82" | 820 m || 
|-id=233 bgcolor=#E9E9E9
| 292233 ||  || — || September 19, 2006 || Anderson Mesa || LONEOS || — || align=right | 2.9 km || 
|-id=234 bgcolor=#d6d6d6
| 292234 ||  || — || September 17, 2006 || Kitt Peak || Spacewatch || URS || align=right | 3.9 km || 
|-id=235 bgcolor=#E9E9E9
| 292235 ||  || — || September 21, 2006 || San Marcello || Pistoia Mountains Obs. || — || align=right | 1.8 km || 
|-id=236 bgcolor=#d6d6d6
| 292236 ||  || — || September 19, 2006 || Catalina || CSS || — || align=right | 3.5 km || 
|-id=237 bgcolor=#d6d6d6
| 292237 ||  || — || September 19, 2006 || Kitt Peak || Spacewatch || — || align=right | 2.2 km || 
|-id=238 bgcolor=#E9E9E9
| 292238 ||  || — || September 19, 2006 || Catalina || CSS || — || align=right data-sort-value="0.84" | 840 m || 
|-id=239 bgcolor=#d6d6d6
| 292239 ||  || — || September 19, 2006 || Kitt Peak || Spacewatch || THM || align=right | 3.0 km || 
|-id=240 bgcolor=#fefefe
| 292240 ||  || — || September 19, 2006 || Kitt Peak || Spacewatch || — || align=right data-sort-value="0.91" | 910 m || 
|-id=241 bgcolor=#E9E9E9
| 292241 ||  || — || September 19, 2006 || Kitt Peak || Spacewatch || — || align=right data-sort-value="0.98" | 980 m || 
|-id=242 bgcolor=#d6d6d6
| 292242 ||  || — || September 19, 2006 || Kitt Peak || Spacewatch || 3:2 || align=right | 4.7 km || 
|-id=243 bgcolor=#fefefe
| 292243 ||  || — || September 19, 2006 || Kitt Peak || Spacewatch || V || align=right data-sort-value="0.65" | 650 m || 
|-id=244 bgcolor=#fefefe
| 292244 ||  || — || September 19, 2006 || Kitt Peak || Spacewatch || — || align=right data-sort-value="0.94" | 940 m || 
|-id=245 bgcolor=#E9E9E9
| 292245 ||  || — || September 19, 2006 || Kitt Peak || Spacewatch || WIT || align=right data-sort-value="0.99" | 990 m || 
|-id=246 bgcolor=#fefefe
| 292246 ||  || — || September 19, 2006 || Kitt Peak || Spacewatch || MAS || align=right data-sort-value="0.77" | 770 m || 
|-id=247 bgcolor=#d6d6d6
| 292247 ||  || — || September 20, 2006 || Palomar || NEAT || — || align=right | 3.8 km || 
|-id=248 bgcolor=#E9E9E9
| 292248 ||  || — || September 22, 2006 || San Marcello || Pistoia Mountains Obs. || — || align=right | 2.0 km || 
|-id=249 bgcolor=#E9E9E9
| 292249 ||  || — || September 18, 2006 || Kitt Peak || Spacewatch || — || align=right | 1.4 km || 
|-id=250 bgcolor=#E9E9E9
| 292250 ||  || — || September 18, 2006 || Kitt Peak || Spacewatch || — || align=right | 1.4 km || 
|-id=251 bgcolor=#d6d6d6
| 292251 ||  || — || September 18, 2006 || Kitt Peak || Spacewatch || THM || align=right | 2.4 km || 
|-id=252 bgcolor=#E9E9E9
| 292252 ||  || — || September 18, 2006 || Kitt Peak || Spacewatch || WIT || align=right | 1.1 km || 
|-id=253 bgcolor=#d6d6d6
| 292253 ||  || — || September 18, 2006 || Kitt Peak || Spacewatch || — || align=right | 2.9 km || 
|-id=254 bgcolor=#d6d6d6
| 292254 ||  || — || September 18, 2006 || Kitt Peak || Spacewatch || — || align=right | 2.9 km || 
|-id=255 bgcolor=#E9E9E9
| 292255 ||  || — || September 18, 2006 || Kitt Peak || Spacewatch || — || align=right data-sort-value="0.81" | 810 m || 
|-id=256 bgcolor=#d6d6d6
| 292256 ||  || — || September 18, 2006 || Kitt Peak || Spacewatch || THM || align=right | 1.8 km || 
|-id=257 bgcolor=#E9E9E9
| 292257 ||  || — || September 18, 2006 || Kitt Peak || Spacewatch || — || align=right | 2.0 km || 
|-id=258 bgcolor=#d6d6d6
| 292258 ||  || — || September 18, 2006 || Kitt Peak || Spacewatch || EOS || align=right | 1.9 km || 
|-id=259 bgcolor=#E9E9E9
| 292259 ||  || — || September 18, 2006 || Kitt Peak || Spacewatch || — || align=right | 1.3 km || 
|-id=260 bgcolor=#E9E9E9
| 292260 ||  || — || September 18, 2006 || Kitt Peak || Spacewatch || AEO || align=right | 1.3 km || 
|-id=261 bgcolor=#E9E9E9
| 292261 ||  || — || September 18, 2006 || Kitt Peak || Spacewatch || — || align=right | 2.6 km || 
|-id=262 bgcolor=#fefefe
| 292262 ||  || — || September 18, 2006 || Kitt Peak || Spacewatch || FLO || align=right data-sort-value="0.67" | 670 m || 
|-id=263 bgcolor=#E9E9E9
| 292263 ||  || — || September 18, 2006 || Kitt Peak || Spacewatch || — || align=right | 1.0 km || 
|-id=264 bgcolor=#d6d6d6
| 292264 ||  || — || September 19, 2006 || Catalina || CSS || NAE || align=right | 5.8 km || 
|-id=265 bgcolor=#fefefe
| 292265 ||  || — || September 19, 2006 || Kitt Peak || Spacewatch || — || align=right | 1.1 km || 
|-id=266 bgcolor=#d6d6d6
| 292266 ||  || — || September 19, 2006 || Kitt Peak || Spacewatch || — || align=right | 2.8 km || 
|-id=267 bgcolor=#E9E9E9
| 292267 ||  || — || September 19, 2006 || Kitt Peak || Spacewatch || — || align=right | 1.7 km || 
|-id=268 bgcolor=#d6d6d6
| 292268 ||  || — || September 20, 2006 || Socorro || LINEAR || — || align=right | 3.8 km || 
|-id=269 bgcolor=#fefefe
| 292269 ||  || — || September 20, 2006 || Anderson Mesa || LONEOS || ERI || align=right | 1.9 km || 
|-id=270 bgcolor=#fefefe
| 292270 ||  || — || September 20, 2006 || Palomar || NEAT || V || align=right data-sort-value="0.73" | 730 m || 
|-id=271 bgcolor=#d6d6d6
| 292271 ||  || — || September 22, 2006 || Anderson Mesa || LONEOS || — || align=right | 3.4 km || 
|-id=272 bgcolor=#d6d6d6
| 292272 ||  || — || September 23, 2006 || Kitt Peak || Spacewatch || HYG || align=right | 3.6 km || 
|-id=273 bgcolor=#fefefe
| 292273 ||  || — || September 24, 2006 || Kitt Peak || Spacewatch || MAS || align=right data-sort-value="0.99" | 990 m || 
|-id=274 bgcolor=#fefefe
| 292274 ||  || — || September 18, 2006 || Catalina || CSS || V || align=right data-sort-value="0.96" | 960 m || 
|-id=275 bgcolor=#E9E9E9
| 292275 ||  || — || September 18, 2006 || Catalina || CSS || GEF || align=right | 2.0 km || 
|-id=276 bgcolor=#d6d6d6
| 292276 ||  || — || September 18, 2006 || Anderson Mesa || LONEOS || HYG || align=right | 4.1 km || 
|-id=277 bgcolor=#E9E9E9
| 292277 ||  || — || September 19, 2006 || Eskridge || Farpoint Obs. || — || align=right | 2.6 km || 
|-id=278 bgcolor=#E9E9E9
| 292278 ||  || — || September 20, 2006 || Palomar || NEAT || — || align=right data-sort-value="0.98" | 980 m || 
|-id=279 bgcolor=#fefefe
| 292279 ||  || — || September 20, 2006 || Palomar || NEAT || V || align=right data-sort-value="0.75" | 750 m || 
|-id=280 bgcolor=#E9E9E9
| 292280 ||  || — || September 20, 2006 || Palomar || NEAT || — || align=right | 2.8 km || 
|-id=281 bgcolor=#E9E9E9
| 292281 ||  || — || September 17, 2006 || Catalina || CSS || — || align=right | 1.8 km || 
|-id=282 bgcolor=#fefefe
| 292282 ||  || — || September 17, 2006 || Catalina || CSS || — || align=right data-sort-value="0.78" | 780 m || 
|-id=283 bgcolor=#E9E9E9
| 292283 ||  || — || September 19, 2006 || Anderson Mesa || LONEOS || AGN || align=right | 1.7 km || 
|-id=284 bgcolor=#E9E9E9
| 292284 ||  || — || September 20, 2006 || Anderson Mesa || LONEOS || WIT || align=right | 1.5 km || 
|-id=285 bgcolor=#d6d6d6
| 292285 ||  || — || September 20, 2006 || Anderson Mesa || LONEOS || EOS || align=right | 3.3 km || 
|-id=286 bgcolor=#d6d6d6
| 292286 ||  || — || September 25, 2006 || Eskridge || Farpoint Obs. || — || align=right | 4.1 km || 
|-id=287 bgcolor=#E9E9E9
| 292287 ||  || — || September 16, 2006 || Catalina || CSS || MAR || align=right | 1.3 km || 
|-id=288 bgcolor=#d6d6d6
| 292288 ||  || — || September 17, 2006 || Catalina || CSS || — || align=right | 5.5 km || 
|-id=289 bgcolor=#E9E9E9
| 292289 ||  || — || September 17, 2006 || Catalina || CSS || — || align=right | 1.5 km || 
|-id=290 bgcolor=#fefefe
| 292290 ||  || — || September 25, 2006 || Socorro || LINEAR || — || align=right | 3.1 km || 
|-id=291 bgcolor=#d6d6d6
| 292291 ||  || — || September 20, 2006 || Anderson Mesa || LONEOS || — || align=right | 3.7 km || 
|-id=292 bgcolor=#fefefe
| 292292 ||  || — || September 20, 2006 || Palomar || NEAT || — || align=right | 1.1 km || 
|-id=293 bgcolor=#d6d6d6
| 292293 ||  || — || September 20, 2006 || Palomar || NEAT || EOS || align=right | 3.2 km || 
|-id=294 bgcolor=#fefefe
| 292294 ||  || — || September 20, 2006 || Catalina || CSS || — || align=right | 1.2 km || 
|-id=295 bgcolor=#d6d6d6
| 292295 ||  || — || September 22, 2006 || Anderson Mesa || LONEOS || EOS || align=right | 2.9 km || 
|-id=296 bgcolor=#fefefe
| 292296 ||  || — || September 22, 2006 || Catalina || CSS || — || align=right | 1.4 km || 
|-id=297 bgcolor=#d6d6d6
| 292297 ||  || — || September 19, 2006 || Kitt Peak || Spacewatch || — || align=right | 4.1 km || 
|-id=298 bgcolor=#E9E9E9
| 292298 ||  || — || September 19, 2006 || Kitt Peak || Spacewatch || — || align=right | 1.2 km || 
|-id=299 bgcolor=#fefefe
| 292299 ||  || — || September 19, 2006 || Kitt Peak || Spacewatch || — || align=right | 1.1 km || 
|-id=300 bgcolor=#d6d6d6
| 292300 ||  || — || September 19, 2006 || Kitt Peak || Spacewatch || EOS || align=right | 1.8 km || 
|}

292301–292400 

|-bgcolor=#E9E9E9
| 292301 ||  || — || September 19, 2006 || Kitt Peak || Spacewatch || — || align=right | 2.2 km || 
|-id=302 bgcolor=#fefefe
| 292302 ||  || — || September 19, 2006 || Kitt Peak || Spacewatch || — || align=right data-sort-value="0.91" | 910 m || 
|-id=303 bgcolor=#E9E9E9
| 292303 ||  || — || September 19, 2006 || Kitt Peak || Spacewatch || — || align=right | 2.4 km || 
|-id=304 bgcolor=#E9E9E9
| 292304 ||  || — || September 19, 2006 || Kitt Peak || Spacewatch || — || align=right | 1.0 km || 
|-id=305 bgcolor=#E9E9E9
| 292305 ||  || — || September 19, 2006 || Kitt Peak || Spacewatch || — || align=right | 1.1 km || 
|-id=306 bgcolor=#E9E9E9
| 292306 ||  || — || September 19, 2006 || Kitt Peak || Spacewatch || — || align=right | 1.1 km || 
|-id=307 bgcolor=#d6d6d6
| 292307 ||  || — || September 19, 2006 || Kitt Peak || Spacewatch || — || align=right | 3.1 km || 
|-id=308 bgcolor=#d6d6d6
| 292308 ||  || — || September 20, 2006 || Palomar || NEAT || VER || align=right | 3.7 km || 
|-id=309 bgcolor=#fefefe
| 292309 ||  || — || September 21, 2006 || Anderson Mesa || LONEOS || NYS || align=right data-sort-value="0.77" | 770 m || 
|-id=310 bgcolor=#E9E9E9
| 292310 ||  || — || September 22, 2006 || Catalina || CSS || — || align=right | 3.3 km || 
|-id=311 bgcolor=#E9E9E9
| 292311 ||  || — || September 23, 2006 || Kitt Peak || Spacewatch || — || align=right | 1.3 km || 
|-id=312 bgcolor=#d6d6d6
| 292312 ||  || — || September 23, 2006 || Kitt Peak || Spacewatch || — || align=right | 2.6 km || 
|-id=313 bgcolor=#d6d6d6
| 292313 ||  || — || September 23, 2006 || Kitt Peak || Spacewatch || — || align=right | 3.4 km || 
|-id=314 bgcolor=#d6d6d6
| 292314 ||  || — || September 23, 2006 || Kitt Peak || Spacewatch || HYG || align=right | 3.2 km || 
|-id=315 bgcolor=#fefefe
| 292315 ||  || — || September 24, 2006 || Kitt Peak || Spacewatch || NYS || align=right data-sort-value="0.67" | 670 m || 
|-id=316 bgcolor=#d6d6d6
| 292316 ||  || — || September 24, 2006 || Kitt Peak || Spacewatch || — || align=right | 3.1 km || 
|-id=317 bgcolor=#d6d6d6
| 292317 ||  || — || September 25, 2006 || Kitt Peak || Spacewatch || EOS || align=right | 2.1 km || 
|-id=318 bgcolor=#fefefe
| 292318 ||  || — || September 25, 2006 || Kitt Peak || Spacewatch || — || align=right data-sort-value="0.96" | 960 m || 
|-id=319 bgcolor=#d6d6d6
| 292319 ||  || — || September 25, 2006 || Kitt Peak || Spacewatch || — || align=right | 4.5 km || 
|-id=320 bgcolor=#E9E9E9
| 292320 ||  || — || September 25, 2006 || Kitt Peak || Spacewatch || — || align=right | 2.6 km || 
|-id=321 bgcolor=#E9E9E9
| 292321 ||  || — || September 25, 2006 || Kitt Peak || Spacewatch || HOF || align=right | 3.5 km || 
|-id=322 bgcolor=#E9E9E9
| 292322 ||  || — || September 25, 2006 || Kitt Peak || Spacewatch || — || align=right | 2.3 km || 
|-id=323 bgcolor=#fefefe
| 292323 ||  || — || September 25, 2006 || Kitt Peak || Spacewatch || — || align=right | 1.4 km || 
|-id=324 bgcolor=#E9E9E9
| 292324 ||  || — || September 25, 2006 || Mount Lemmon || Mount Lemmon Survey || — || align=right | 1.6 km || 
|-id=325 bgcolor=#d6d6d6
| 292325 ||  || — || September 25, 2006 || Kitt Peak || Spacewatch || — || align=right | 3.0 km || 
|-id=326 bgcolor=#E9E9E9
| 292326 ||  || — || September 25, 2006 || Kitt Peak || Spacewatch || HOF || align=right | 3.2 km || 
|-id=327 bgcolor=#E9E9E9
| 292327 ||  || — || September 25, 2006 || Mount Lemmon || Mount Lemmon Survey || — || align=right | 1.7 km || 
|-id=328 bgcolor=#E9E9E9
| 292328 ||  || — || September 25, 2006 || Mount Lemmon || Mount Lemmon Survey || — || align=right | 1.8 km || 
|-id=329 bgcolor=#fefefe
| 292329 ||  || — || September 25, 2006 || Anderson Mesa || LONEOS || FLO || align=right data-sort-value="0.97" | 970 m || 
|-id=330 bgcolor=#d6d6d6
| 292330 ||  || — || September 25, 2006 || Mount Lemmon || Mount Lemmon Survey || THM || align=right | 2.4 km || 
|-id=331 bgcolor=#fefefe
| 292331 ||  || — || September 25, 2006 || Mount Lemmon || Mount Lemmon Survey || MAS || align=right data-sort-value="0.96" | 960 m || 
|-id=332 bgcolor=#E9E9E9
| 292332 ||  || — || September 25, 2006 || Kitt Peak || Spacewatch || — || align=right | 1.8 km || 
|-id=333 bgcolor=#d6d6d6
| 292333 ||  || — || September 25, 2006 || Mount Lemmon || Mount Lemmon Survey || — || align=right | 3.4 km || 
|-id=334 bgcolor=#d6d6d6
| 292334 ||  || — || September 25, 2006 || Mount Lemmon || Mount Lemmon Survey || EUP || align=right | 4.5 km || 
|-id=335 bgcolor=#d6d6d6
| 292335 ||  || — || September 25, 2006 || Kitt Peak || Spacewatch || — || align=right | 3.0 km || 
|-id=336 bgcolor=#E9E9E9
| 292336 ||  || — || September 25, 2006 || Mount Lemmon || Mount Lemmon Survey || WIT || align=right | 1.2 km || 
|-id=337 bgcolor=#fefefe
| 292337 ||  || — || September 26, 2006 || Kitt Peak || Spacewatch || MAS || align=right data-sort-value="0.77" | 770 m || 
|-id=338 bgcolor=#d6d6d6
| 292338 ||  || — || September 26, 2006 || Mount Lemmon || Mount Lemmon Survey || — || align=right | 2.9 km || 
|-id=339 bgcolor=#d6d6d6
| 292339 ||  || — || September 26, 2006 || Mount Lemmon || Mount Lemmon Survey || — || align=right | 2.9 km || 
|-id=340 bgcolor=#E9E9E9
| 292340 ||  || — || September 26, 2006 || Kitt Peak || Spacewatch || AGN || align=right | 1.4 km || 
|-id=341 bgcolor=#d6d6d6
| 292341 ||  || — || September 26, 2006 || Kitt Peak || Spacewatch || — || align=right | 3.7 km || 
|-id=342 bgcolor=#E9E9E9
| 292342 ||  || — || September 26, 2006 || Kitt Peak || Spacewatch || — || align=right | 2.4 km || 
|-id=343 bgcolor=#E9E9E9
| 292343 ||  || — || September 25, 2006 || Moletai || Molėtai Obs. || MIT || align=right | 3.0 km || 
|-id=344 bgcolor=#d6d6d6
| 292344 ||  || — || September 24, 2006 || Kitt Peak || Spacewatch || — || align=right | 2.7 km || 
|-id=345 bgcolor=#d6d6d6
| 292345 ||  || — || September 24, 2006 || Kitt Peak || Spacewatch || — || align=right | 2.6 km || 
|-id=346 bgcolor=#E9E9E9
| 292346 ||  || — || September 25, 2006 || Anderson Mesa || LONEOS || — || align=right data-sort-value="0.94" | 940 m || 
|-id=347 bgcolor=#E9E9E9
| 292347 ||  || — || September 25, 2006 || Mount Lemmon || Mount Lemmon Survey || — || align=right | 1.2 km || 
|-id=348 bgcolor=#d6d6d6
| 292348 ||  || — || September 26, 2006 || Kitt Peak || Spacewatch || — || align=right | 3.7 km || 
|-id=349 bgcolor=#d6d6d6
| 292349 ||  || — || September 26, 2006 || Catalina || CSS || — || align=right | 4.1 km || 
|-id=350 bgcolor=#E9E9E9
| 292350 ||  || — || September 27, 2006 || Kitt Peak || Spacewatch || — || align=right | 2.7 km || 
|-id=351 bgcolor=#E9E9E9
| 292351 ||  || — || September 27, 2006 || Kitt Peak || Spacewatch || — || align=right | 2.3 km || 
|-id=352 bgcolor=#fefefe
| 292352 ||  || — || September 26, 2006 || Antares || ARO || — || align=right data-sort-value="0.88" | 880 m || 
|-id=353 bgcolor=#d6d6d6
| 292353 ||  || — || September 25, 2006 || Socorro || LINEAR || — || align=right | 4.5 km || 
|-id=354 bgcolor=#E9E9E9
| 292354 ||  || — || September 25, 2006 || Mount Lemmon || Mount Lemmon Survey || — || align=right data-sort-value="0.90" | 900 m || 
|-id=355 bgcolor=#d6d6d6
| 292355 ||  || — || September 26, 2006 || Kitt Peak || Spacewatch || — || align=right | 3.1 km || 
|-id=356 bgcolor=#E9E9E9
| 292356 ||  || — || September 26, 2006 || Kitt Peak || Spacewatch || — || align=right | 2.1 km || 
|-id=357 bgcolor=#E9E9E9
| 292357 ||  || — || September 26, 2006 || Kitt Peak || Spacewatch || — || align=right | 2.5 km || 
|-id=358 bgcolor=#fefefe
| 292358 ||  || — || September 26, 2006 || Mount Lemmon || Mount Lemmon Survey || NYS || align=right data-sort-value="0.70" | 700 m || 
|-id=359 bgcolor=#E9E9E9
| 292359 ||  || — || September 26, 2006 || Mount Lemmon || Mount Lemmon Survey || — || align=right data-sort-value="0.98" | 980 m || 
|-id=360 bgcolor=#fefefe
| 292360 ||  || — || September 26, 2006 || Mount Lemmon || Mount Lemmon Survey || — || align=right data-sort-value="0.80" | 800 m || 
|-id=361 bgcolor=#d6d6d6
| 292361 ||  || — || September 26, 2006 || Kitt Peak || Spacewatch || — || align=right | 3.6 km || 
|-id=362 bgcolor=#fefefe
| 292362 ||  || — || September 26, 2006 || Kitt Peak || Spacewatch || — || align=right data-sort-value="0.49" | 490 m || 
|-id=363 bgcolor=#fefefe
| 292363 ||  || — || September 26, 2006 || Kitt Peak || Spacewatch || MAS || align=right data-sort-value="0.83" | 830 m || 
|-id=364 bgcolor=#d6d6d6
| 292364 ||  || — || September 26, 2006 || Kitt Peak || Spacewatch || — || align=right | 2.9 km || 
|-id=365 bgcolor=#fefefe
| 292365 ||  || — || September 26, 2006 || Mount Lemmon || Mount Lemmon Survey || MAS || align=right data-sort-value="0.97" | 970 m || 
|-id=366 bgcolor=#E9E9E9
| 292366 ||  || — || September 26, 2006 || Mount Lemmon || Mount Lemmon Survey || — || align=right data-sort-value="0.82" | 820 m || 
|-id=367 bgcolor=#fefefe
| 292367 ||  || — || September 26, 2006 || Mount Lemmon || Mount Lemmon Survey || MAS || align=right data-sort-value="0.73" | 730 m || 
|-id=368 bgcolor=#E9E9E9
| 292368 ||  || — || September 26, 2006 || Kitt Peak || Spacewatch || — || align=right | 1.7 km || 
|-id=369 bgcolor=#fefefe
| 292369 ||  || — || September 26, 2006 || Kitt Peak || Spacewatch || — || align=right data-sort-value="0.82" | 820 m || 
|-id=370 bgcolor=#d6d6d6
| 292370 ||  || — || September 26, 2006 || Kitt Peak || Spacewatch || — || align=right | 4.2 km || 
|-id=371 bgcolor=#fefefe
| 292371 ||  || — || September 26, 2006 || Kitt Peak || Spacewatch || NYS || align=right data-sort-value="0.72" | 720 m || 
|-id=372 bgcolor=#d6d6d6
| 292372 ||  || — || September 26, 2006 || Mount Lemmon || Mount Lemmon Survey || EOS || align=right | 2.1 km || 
|-id=373 bgcolor=#d6d6d6
| 292373 ||  || — || September 26, 2006 || Catalina || CSS || — || align=right | 4.3 km || 
|-id=374 bgcolor=#E9E9E9
| 292374 ||  || — || September 26, 2006 || Kitt Peak || Spacewatch || AGN || align=right | 1.2 km || 
|-id=375 bgcolor=#fefefe
| 292375 ||  || — || September 26, 2006 || Kitt Peak || Spacewatch || — || align=right | 1.2 km || 
|-id=376 bgcolor=#d6d6d6
| 292376 ||  || — || September 26, 2006 || Kitt Peak || Spacewatch || VER || align=right | 3.8 km || 
|-id=377 bgcolor=#fefefe
| 292377 ||  || — || September 26, 2006 || Kitt Peak || Spacewatch || NYS || align=right data-sort-value="0.78" | 780 m || 
|-id=378 bgcolor=#d6d6d6
| 292378 ||  || — || September 26, 2006 || Kitt Peak || Spacewatch || — || align=right | 2.4 km || 
|-id=379 bgcolor=#fefefe
| 292379 ||  || — || September 26, 2006 || Kitt Peak || Spacewatch || MAS || align=right data-sort-value="0.85" | 850 m || 
|-id=380 bgcolor=#d6d6d6
| 292380 ||  || — || September 26, 2006 || Kitt Peak || Spacewatch || KOR || align=right | 1.9 km || 
|-id=381 bgcolor=#fefefe
| 292381 ||  || — || September 26, 2006 || Kitt Peak || Spacewatch || NYS || align=right data-sort-value="0.88" | 880 m || 
|-id=382 bgcolor=#d6d6d6
| 292382 ||  || — || September 26, 2006 || Mount Lemmon || Mount Lemmon Survey || — || align=right | 4.8 km || 
|-id=383 bgcolor=#E9E9E9
| 292383 ||  || — || September 26, 2006 || Mount Lemmon || Mount Lemmon Survey || — || align=right | 2.5 km || 
|-id=384 bgcolor=#d6d6d6
| 292384 ||  || — || September 26, 2006 || Mount Lemmon || Mount Lemmon Survey || — || align=right | 3.0 km || 
|-id=385 bgcolor=#d6d6d6
| 292385 ||  || — || September 26, 2006 || Kitt Peak || Spacewatch || EOS || align=right | 2.5 km || 
|-id=386 bgcolor=#E9E9E9
| 292386 ||  || — || September 26, 2006 || Kitt Peak || Spacewatch || — || align=right | 1.9 km || 
|-id=387 bgcolor=#d6d6d6
| 292387 ||  || — || September 26, 2006 || Kitt Peak || Spacewatch || HYG || align=right | 4.4 km || 
|-id=388 bgcolor=#d6d6d6
| 292388 ||  || — || September 26, 2006 || Kitt Peak || Spacewatch || EOS || align=right | 2.1 km || 
|-id=389 bgcolor=#E9E9E9
| 292389 ||  || — || September 26, 2006 || Kitt Peak || Spacewatch || WIT || align=right | 1.3 km || 
|-id=390 bgcolor=#d6d6d6
| 292390 ||  || — || September 26, 2006 || Kitt Peak || Spacewatch || HYG || align=right | 3.3 km || 
|-id=391 bgcolor=#d6d6d6
| 292391 ||  || — || September 26, 2006 || Kitt Peak || Spacewatch || — || align=right | 3.6 km || 
|-id=392 bgcolor=#fefefe
| 292392 ||  || — || September 26, 2006 || Kitt Peak || Spacewatch || — || align=right | 1.1 km || 
|-id=393 bgcolor=#E9E9E9
| 292393 ||  || — || September 26, 2006 || Mount Lemmon || Mount Lemmon Survey || — || align=right | 2.2 km || 
|-id=394 bgcolor=#E9E9E9
| 292394 ||  || — || September 26, 2006 || Mount Lemmon || Mount Lemmon Survey || — || align=right | 1.3 km || 
|-id=395 bgcolor=#d6d6d6
| 292395 ||  || — || September 27, 2006 || Mount Lemmon || Mount Lemmon Survey || — || align=right | 3.4 km || 
|-id=396 bgcolor=#fefefe
| 292396 ||  || — || September 27, 2006 || Mount Lemmon || Mount Lemmon Survey || V || align=right data-sort-value="0.85" | 850 m || 
|-id=397 bgcolor=#E9E9E9
| 292397 ||  || — || September 27, 2006 || Kitt Peak || Spacewatch || — || align=right | 1.8 km || 
|-id=398 bgcolor=#E9E9E9
| 292398 ||  || — || September 28, 2006 || Socorro || LINEAR || — || align=right | 2.9 km || 
|-id=399 bgcolor=#d6d6d6
| 292399 ||  || — || September 28, 2006 || Kitt Peak || Spacewatch || EOS || align=right | 2.4 km || 
|-id=400 bgcolor=#fefefe
| 292400 ||  || — || September 28, 2006 || Kitt Peak || Spacewatch || — || align=right data-sort-value="0.98" | 980 m || 
|}

292401–292500 

|-bgcolor=#fefefe
| 292401 ||  || — || September 29, 2006 || Anderson Mesa || LONEOS || — || align=right | 1.4 km || 
|-id=402 bgcolor=#fefefe
| 292402 ||  || — || September 26, 2006 || Socorro || LINEAR || NYS || align=right data-sort-value="0.68" | 680 m || 
|-id=403 bgcolor=#d6d6d6
| 292403 ||  || — || September 28, 2006 || Socorro || LINEAR || — || align=right | 2.8 km || 
|-id=404 bgcolor=#d6d6d6
| 292404 ||  || — || September 25, 2006 || Mount Lemmon || Mount Lemmon Survey || — || align=right | 3.8 km || 
|-id=405 bgcolor=#E9E9E9
| 292405 ||  || — || September 17, 2006 || Kitt Peak || Spacewatch || — || align=right | 1.1 km || 
|-id=406 bgcolor=#d6d6d6
| 292406 ||  || — || September 19, 2006 || Catalina || CSS || AEG || align=right | 4.4 km || 
|-id=407 bgcolor=#fefefe
| 292407 ||  || — || September 19, 2006 || Catalina || CSS || — || align=right | 1.1 km || 
|-id=408 bgcolor=#d6d6d6
| 292408 ||  || — || September 19, 2006 || Catalina || CSS || ULA7:4 || align=right | 7.3 km || 
|-id=409 bgcolor=#d6d6d6
| 292409 ||  || — || September 22, 2006 || Anderson Mesa || LONEOS || — || align=right | 4.2 km || 
|-id=410 bgcolor=#d6d6d6
| 292410 ||  || — || September 25, 2006 || Catalina || CSS || — || align=right | 3.8 km || 
|-id=411 bgcolor=#fefefe
| 292411 ||  || — || September 30, 2006 || Catalina || CSS || CLA || align=right | 2.1 km || 
|-id=412 bgcolor=#E9E9E9
| 292412 ||  || — || September 30, 2006 || Catalina || CSS || — || align=right | 2.8 km || 
|-id=413 bgcolor=#E9E9E9
| 292413 ||  || — || September 25, 2006 || Kitt Peak || Spacewatch || EUN || align=right | 1.7 km || 
|-id=414 bgcolor=#fefefe
| 292414 ||  || — || September 25, 2006 || Kitt Peak || Spacewatch || — || align=right data-sort-value="0.75" | 750 m || 
|-id=415 bgcolor=#E9E9E9
| 292415 ||  || — || September 25, 2006 || Kitt Peak || Spacewatch || — || align=right | 1.6 km || 
|-id=416 bgcolor=#fefefe
| 292416 ||  || — || September 25, 2006 || Kitt Peak || Spacewatch || FLO || align=right data-sort-value="0.77" | 770 m || 
|-id=417 bgcolor=#d6d6d6
| 292417 ||  || — || September 25, 2006 || Mount Lemmon || Mount Lemmon Survey || — || align=right | 4.0 km || 
|-id=418 bgcolor=#fefefe
| 292418 ||  || — || September 26, 2006 || Catalina || CSS || — || align=right | 1.1 km || 
|-id=419 bgcolor=#fefefe
| 292419 ||  || — || September 27, 2006 || Kitt Peak || Spacewatch || NYS || align=right data-sort-value="0.69" | 690 m || 
|-id=420 bgcolor=#d6d6d6
| 292420 ||  || — || September 27, 2006 || Kitt Peak || Spacewatch || — || align=right | 3.4 km || 
|-id=421 bgcolor=#E9E9E9
| 292421 ||  || — || September 27, 2006 || Kitt Peak || Spacewatch || PAD || align=right | 2.9 km || 
|-id=422 bgcolor=#E9E9E9
| 292422 ||  || — || September 27, 2006 || Mount Lemmon || Mount Lemmon Survey || GEF || align=right | 1.5 km || 
|-id=423 bgcolor=#E9E9E9
| 292423 ||  || — || September 27, 2006 || Kitt Peak || Spacewatch || — || align=right | 1.2 km || 
|-id=424 bgcolor=#E9E9E9
| 292424 ||  || — || September 27, 2006 || Kitt Peak || Spacewatch || — || align=right | 1.0 km || 
|-id=425 bgcolor=#d6d6d6
| 292425 ||  || — || September 27, 2006 || Kitt Peak || Spacewatch || VER || align=right | 2.9 km || 
|-id=426 bgcolor=#E9E9E9
| 292426 ||  || — || September 27, 2006 || Kitt Peak || Spacewatch || — || align=right | 1.8 km || 
|-id=427 bgcolor=#fefefe
| 292427 ||  || — || September 27, 2006 || Kitt Peak || Spacewatch || — || align=right data-sort-value="0.71" | 710 m || 
|-id=428 bgcolor=#fefefe
| 292428 ||  || — || September 27, 2006 || Kitt Peak || Spacewatch || — || align=right | 1.1 km || 
|-id=429 bgcolor=#fefefe
| 292429 ||  || — || September 27, 2006 || Kitt Peak || Spacewatch || MAS || align=right data-sort-value="0.57" | 570 m || 
|-id=430 bgcolor=#d6d6d6
| 292430 ||  || — || September 27, 2006 || Kitt Peak || Spacewatch || — || align=right | 3.0 km || 
|-id=431 bgcolor=#fefefe
| 292431 ||  || — || September 27, 2006 || Kitt Peak || Spacewatch || NYS || align=right data-sort-value="0.58" | 580 m || 
|-id=432 bgcolor=#E9E9E9
| 292432 ||  || — || September 28, 2006 || Mount Lemmon || Mount Lemmon Survey || — || align=right | 2.1 km || 
|-id=433 bgcolor=#fefefe
| 292433 ||  || — || September 28, 2006 || Kitt Peak || Spacewatch || MAS || align=right data-sort-value="0.78" | 780 m || 
|-id=434 bgcolor=#E9E9E9
| 292434 ||  || — || September 28, 2006 || Kitt Peak || Spacewatch || — || align=right | 1.4 km || 
|-id=435 bgcolor=#d6d6d6
| 292435 ||  || — || September 28, 2006 || Kitt Peak || Spacewatch || HYG || align=right | 3.1 km || 
|-id=436 bgcolor=#E9E9E9
| 292436 ||  || — || September 28, 2006 || Kitt Peak || Spacewatch || — || align=right | 2.0 km || 
|-id=437 bgcolor=#E9E9E9
| 292437 ||  || — || September 28, 2006 || Kitt Peak || Spacewatch || KON || align=right | 3.0 km || 
|-id=438 bgcolor=#d6d6d6
| 292438 ||  || — || September 28, 2006 || Kitt Peak || Spacewatch || — || align=right | 4.8 km || 
|-id=439 bgcolor=#d6d6d6
| 292439 ||  || — || September 28, 2006 || Kitt Peak || Spacewatch || — || align=right | 4.0 km || 
|-id=440 bgcolor=#fefefe
| 292440 ||  || — || September 29, 2006 || Anderson Mesa || LONEOS || — || align=right | 1.1 km || 
|-id=441 bgcolor=#d6d6d6
| 292441 ||  || — || September 30, 2006 || Catalina || CSS || — || align=right | 4.1 km || 
|-id=442 bgcolor=#E9E9E9
| 292442 ||  || — || September 30, 2006 || Catalina || CSS || — || align=right | 2.6 km || 
|-id=443 bgcolor=#d6d6d6
| 292443 ||  || — || September 30, 2006 || Catalina || CSS || — || align=right | 3.5 km || 
|-id=444 bgcolor=#fefefe
| 292444 ||  || — || September 30, 2006 || Catalina || CSS || — || align=right data-sort-value="0.99" | 990 m || 
|-id=445 bgcolor=#d6d6d6
| 292445 ||  || — || September 30, 2006 || Catalina || CSS || — || align=right | 3.7 km || 
|-id=446 bgcolor=#d6d6d6
| 292446 ||  || — || September 30, 2006 || Catalina || CSS || — || align=right | 4.1 km || 
|-id=447 bgcolor=#d6d6d6
| 292447 ||  || — || September 30, 2006 || Catalina || CSS || — || align=right | 5.3 km || 
|-id=448 bgcolor=#E9E9E9
| 292448 ||  || — || September 30, 2006 || Catalina || CSS || — || align=right | 3.4 km || 
|-id=449 bgcolor=#d6d6d6
| 292449 ||  || — || September 30, 2006 || Mount Lemmon || Mount Lemmon Survey || EOS || align=right | 2.6 km || 
|-id=450 bgcolor=#fefefe
| 292450 ||  || — || September 30, 2006 || Catalina || CSS || — || align=right data-sort-value="0.69" | 690 m || 
|-id=451 bgcolor=#d6d6d6
| 292451 ||  || — || September 30, 2006 || Catalina || CSS || — || align=right | 2.5 km || 
|-id=452 bgcolor=#E9E9E9
| 292452 ||  || — || September 30, 2006 || Catalina || CSS || — || align=right | 1.9 km || 
|-id=453 bgcolor=#fefefe
| 292453 ||  || — || September 30, 2006 || Junk Bond || D. Healy || FLO || align=right data-sort-value="0.70" | 700 m || 
|-id=454 bgcolor=#d6d6d6
| 292454 ||  || — || September 30, 2006 || Mount Lemmon || Mount Lemmon Survey || — || align=right | 3.3 km || 
|-id=455 bgcolor=#d6d6d6
| 292455 ||  || — || September 30, 2006 || Mount Lemmon || Mount Lemmon Survey || LIX || align=right | 4.0 km || 
|-id=456 bgcolor=#d6d6d6
| 292456 ||  || — || September 30, 2006 || Mount Lemmon || Mount Lemmon Survey || 628 || align=right | 2.3 km || 
|-id=457 bgcolor=#d6d6d6
| 292457 ||  || — || September 30, 2006 || Mount Lemmon || Mount Lemmon Survey || — || align=right | 2.7 km || 
|-id=458 bgcolor=#d6d6d6
| 292458 ||  || — || September 30, 2006 || Mount Lemmon || Mount Lemmon Survey || — || align=right | 4.1 km || 
|-id=459 bgcolor=#d6d6d6
| 292459 Antoniolasciac ||  ||  || September 29, 2006 || Farra d'Isonzo || Farra d'Isonzo || EOS || align=right | 2.5 km || 
|-id=460 bgcolor=#E9E9E9
| 292460 ||  || — || September 23, 2006 || Kitt Peak || Spacewatch || — || align=right data-sort-value="0.98" | 980 m || 
|-id=461 bgcolor=#d6d6d6
| 292461 ||  || — || September 28, 2006 || Catalina || CSS || EOS || align=right | 2.7 km || 
|-id=462 bgcolor=#d6d6d6
| 292462 ||  || — || September 16, 2006 || Apache Point || A. C. Becker || — || align=right | 3.6 km || 
|-id=463 bgcolor=#d6d6d6
| 292463 ||  || — || September 17, 2006 || Apache Point || A. C. Becker || — || align=right | 3.2 km || 
|-id=464 bgcolor=#E9E9E9
| 292464 ||  || — || September 17, 2006 || Apache Point || A. C. Becker || AGN || align=right | 1.6 km || 
|-id=465 bgcolor=#d6d6d6
| 292465 ||  || — || September 17, 2006 || Apache Point || A. C. Becker || — || align=right | 3.2 km || 
|-id=466 bgcolor=#d6d6d6
| 292466 ||  || — || September 17, 2006 || Apache Point || A. C. Becker || — || align=right | 2.5 km || 
|-id=467 bgcolor=#d6d6d6
| 292467 ||  || — || September 18, 2006 || Apache Point || A. C. Becker || — || align=right | 2.8 km || 
|-id=468 bgcolor=#fefefe
| 292468 ||  || — || September 27, 2006 || Apache Point || A. C. Becker || — || align=right | 2.5 km || 
|-id=469 bgcolor=#E9E9E9
| 292469 ||  || — || September 27, 2006 || Apache Point || A. C. Becker || — || align=right | 1.5 km || 
|-id=470 bgcolor=#d6d6d6
| 292470 ||  || — || September 28, 2006 || Apache Point || A. C. Becker || — || align=right | 4.8 km || 
|-id=471 bgcolor=#d6d6d6
| 292471 ||  || — || September 30, 2006 || Apache Point || A. C. Becker || URS || align=right | 4.2 km || 
|-id=472 bgcolor=#d6d6d6
| 292472 ||  || — || September 30, 2006 || Apache Point || A. C. Becker || — || align=right | 3.7 km || 
|-id=473 bgcolor=#E9E9E9
| 292473 ||  || — || September 30, 2006 || Apache Point || A. C. Becker || — || align=right | 3.0 km || 
|-id=474 bgcolor=#E9E9E9
| 292474 ||  || — || September 17, 2006 || Catalina || CSS || — || align=right | 1.1 km || 
|-id=475 bgcolor=#d6d6d6
| 292475 ||  || — || September 17, 2006 || Kitt Peak || Spacewatch || — || align=right | 3.2 km || 
|-id=476 bgcolor=#E9E9E9
| 292476 ||  || — || September 19, 2006 || Kitt Peak || Spacewatch || — || align=right | 2.2 km || 
|-id=477 bgcolor=#E9E9E9
| 292477 ||  || — || September 19, 2006 || Kitt Peak || Spacewatch || — || align=right | 1.9 km || 
|-id=478 bgcolor=#d6d6d6
| 292478 ||  || — || September 25, 2006 || Kitt Peak || Spacewatch || EOS || align=right | 2.1 km || 
|-id=479 bgcolor=#E9E9E9
| 292479 ||  || — || September 26, 2006 || Kitt Peak || Spacewatch || — || align=right | 2.1 km || 
|-id=480 bgcolor=#fefefe
| 292480 ||  || — || September 28, 2006 || Kitt Peak || Spacewatch || — || align=right | 1.1 km || 
|-id=481 bgcolor=#d6d6d6
| 292481 ||  || — || September 30, 2006 || Mount Lemmon || Mount Lemmon Survey || — || align=right | 3.2 km || 
|-id=482 bgcolor=#fefefe
| 292482 ||  || — || September 16, 2006 || Kitt Peak || Spacewatch || ERI || align=right | 1.2 km || 
|-id=483 bgcolor=#fefefe
| 292483 ||  || — || September 17, 2006 || Kitt Peak || Spacewatch || MAS || align=right data-sort-value="0.66" | 660 m || 
|-id=484 bgcolor=#E9E9E9
| 292484 ||  || — || September 18, 2006 || Catalina || CSS || — || align=right | 1.6 km || 
|-id=485 bgcolor=#fefefe
| 292485 ||  || — || September 18, 2006 || Kitt Peak || Spacewatch || — || align=right data-sort-value="0.64" | 640 m || 
|-id=486 bgcolor=#E9E9E9
| 292486 ||  || — || September 19, 2006 || Catalina || CSS || MAR || align=right | 2.0 km || 
|-id=487 bgcolor=#E9E9E9
| 292487 ||  || — || September 26, 2006 || Mount Lemmon || Mount Lemmon Survey || — || align=right | 1.6 km || 
|-id=488 bgcolor=#E9E9E9
| 292488 ||  || — || September 27, 2006 || Mount Lemmon || Mount Lemmon Survey || — || align=right | 2.7 km || 
|-id=489 bgcolor=#fefefe
| 292489 ||  || — || September 28, 2006 || Mount Lemmon || Mount Lemmon Survey || — || align=right | 1.1 km || 
|-id=490 bgcolor=#E9E9E9
| 292490 ||  || — || September 24, 2006 || Moletai || Molėtai Obs. || ADE || align=right | 2.4 km || 
|-id=491 bgcolor=#E9E9E9
| 292491 ||  || — || September 28, 2006 || Kitt Peak || Spacewatch || — || align=right | 1.3 km || 
|-id=492 bgcolor=#d6d6d6
| 292492 ||  || — || September 26, 2006 || Catalina || CSS || TIR || align=right | 3.7 km || 
|-id=493 bgcolor=#d6d6d6
| 292493 ||  || — || September 18, 2006 || Kitt Peak || Spacewatch || — || align=right | 3.0 km || 
|-id=494 bgcolor=#d6d6d6
| 292494 ||  || — || September 28, 2006 || Catalina || CSS || — || align=right | 5.3 km || 
|-id=495 bgcolor=#d6d6d6
| 292495 ||  || — || September 30, 2006 || Catalina || CSS || — || align=right | 4.1 km || 
|-id=496 bgcolor=#d6d6d6
| 292496 ||  || — || October 2, 2006 || Mount Lemmon || Mount Lemmon Survey || — || align=right | 4.1 km || 
|-id=497 bgcolor=#d6d6d6
| 292497 ||  || — || October 12, 2006 || Kanab || E. E. Sheridan || — || align=right | 2.8 km || 
|-id=498 bgcolor=#d6d6d6
| 292498 ||  || — || October 1, 2006 || Piszkéstető || K. Sárneczky || — || align=right | 2.9 km || 
|-id=499 bgcolor=#d6d6d6
| 292499 ||  || — || October 14, 2006 || Piszkéstető || K. Sárneczky, Z. Kuli || — || align=right | 3.5 km || 
|-id=500 bgcolor=#E9E9E9
| 292500 ||  || — || October 10, 2006 || Palomar || NEAT || — || align=right | 1.3 km || 
|}

292501–292600 

|-bgcolor=#d6d6d6
| 292501 ||  || — || October 10, 2006 || Palomar || NEAT || — || align=right | 4.6 km || 
|-id=502 bgcolor=#E9E9E9
| 292502 ||  || — || October 10, 2006 || Palomar || NEAT || — || align=right | 2.7 km || 
|-id=503 bgcolor=#fefefe
| 292503 ||  || — || October 11, 2006 || Kitt Peak || Spacewatch || — || align=right | 1.0 km || 
|-id=504 bgcolor=#d6d6d6
| 292504 ||  || — || October 11, 2006 || Kitt Peak || Spacewatch || — || align=right | 2.9 km || 
|-id=505 bgcolor=#E9E9E9
| 292505 ||  || — || October 11, 2006 || Kitt Peak || Spacewatch || — || align=right | 1.1 km || 
|-id=506 bgcolor=#E9E9E9
| 292506 ||  || — || October 11, 2006 || Kitt Peak || Spacewatch || — || align=right | 3.1 km || 
|-id=507 bgcolor=#d6d6d6
| 292507 ||  || — || October 11, 2006 || Kitt Peak || Spacewatch || — || align=right | 3.3 km || 
|-id=508 bgcolor=#d6d6d6
| 292508 ||  || — || October 11, 2006 || Kitt Peak || Spacewatch || HYG || align=right | 3.7 km || 
|-id=509 bgcolor=#d6d6d6
| 292509 ||  || — || October 11, 2006 || Kitt Peak || Spacewatch || — || align=right | 3.6 km || 
|-id=510 bgcolor=#E9E9E9
| 292510 ||  || — || October 11, 2006 || Kitt Peak || Spacewatch || — || align=right | 2.6 km || 
|-id=511 bgcolor=#E9E9E9
| 292511 ||  || — || October 12, 2006 || Kitt Peak || Spacewatch || — || align=right | 2.4 km || 
|-id=512 bgcolor=#E9E9E9
| 292512 ||  || — || October 12, 2006 || Kitt Peak || Spacewatch || — || align=right | 2.1 km || 
|-id=513 bgcolor=#d6d6d6
| 292513 ||  || — || October 12, 2006 || Kitt Peak || Spacewatch || — || align=right | 3.4 km || 
|-id=514 bgcolor=#d6d6d6
| 292514 ||  || — || October 12, 2006 || Kitt Peak || Spacewatch || — || align=right | 2.8 km || 
|-id=515 bgcolor=#fefefe
| 292515 ||  || — || October 12, 2006 || Kitt Peak || Spacewatch || — || align=right data-sort-value="0.98" | 980 m || 
|-id=516 bgcolor=#d6d6d6
| 292516 ||  || — || October 12, 2006 || Kitt Peak || Spacewatch || — || align=right | 3.2 km || 
|-id=517 bgcolor=#E9E9E9
| 292517 ||  || — || October 12, 2006 || Kitt Peak || Spacewatch || — || align=right | 2.2 km || 
|-id=518 bgcolor=#E9E9E9
| 292518 ||  || — || October 12, 2006 || Kitt Peak || Spacewatch || HEN || align=right | 1.2 km || 
|-id=519 bgcolor=#fefefe
| 292519 ||  || — || October 12, 2006 || Kitt Peak || Spacewatch || — || align=right data-sort-value="0.74" | 740 m || 
|-id=520 bgcolor=#E9E9E9
| 292520 ||  || — || October 12, 2006 || Kitt Peak || Spacewatch || — || align=right | 2.1 km || 
|-id=521 bgcolor=#E9E9E9
| 292521 ||  || — || October 12, 2006 || Kitt Peak || Spacewatch || MRX || align=right | 1.0 km || 
|-id=522 bgcolor=#fefefe
| 292522 ||  || — || October 12, 2006 || Kitt Peak || Spacewatch || LCI || align=right | 1.3 km || 
|-id=523 bgcolor=#E9E9E9
| 292523 ||  || — || October 12, 2006 || Kitt Peak || Spacewatch || RAF || align=right | 1.3 km || 
|-id=524 bgcolor=#fefefe
| 292524 ||  || — || October 12, 2006 || Kitt Peak || Spacewatch || V || align=right data-sort-value="0.87" | 870 m || 
|-id=525 bgcolor=#E9E9E9
| 292525 ||  || — || October 12, 2006 || Kitt Peak || Spacewatch || MIS || align=right | 1.9 km || 
|-id=526 bgcolor=#d6d6d6
| 292526 ||  || — || October 12, 2006 || Kitt Peak || Spacewatch || THM || align=right | 2.6 km || 
|-id=527 bgcolor=#E9E9E9
| 292527 ||  || — || October 12, 2006 || Kitt Peak || Spacewatch || EUN || align=right | 2.3 km || 
|-id=528 bgcolor=#d6d6d6
| 292528 ||  || — || October 12, 2006 || Kitt Peak || Spacewatch || THM || align=right | 2.2 km || 
|-id=529 bgcolor=#d6d6d6
| 292529 ||  || — || October 12, 2006 || Kitt Peak || Spacewatch || — || align=right | 2.3 km || 
|-id=530 bgcolor=#E9E9E9
| 292530 ||  || — || October 12, 2006 || Kitt Peak || Spacewatch || — || align=right | 1.7 km || 
|-id=531 bgcolor=#d6d6d6
| 292531 ||  || — || October 12, 2006 || Kitt Peak || Spacewatch || — || align=right | 3.4 km || 
|-id=532 bgcolor=#d6d6d6
| 292532 ||  || — || October 12, 2006 || Kitt Peak || Spacewatch || THM || align=right | 2.9 km || 
|-id=533 bgcolor=#d6d6d6
| 292533 ||  || — || October 12, 2006 || Kitt Peak || Spacewatch || THM || align=right | 3.0 km || 
|-id=534 bgcolor=#E9E9E9
| 292534 ||  || — || October 12, 2006 || Kitt Peak || Spacewatch || — || align=right | 1.9 km || 
|-id=535 bgcolor=#d6d6d6
| 292535 ||  || — || October 12, 2006 || Kitt Peak || Spacewatch || KOR || align=right | 1.3 km || 
|-id=536 bgcolor=#E9E9E9
| 292536 ||  || — || October 12, 2006 || Kitt Peak || Spacewatch || NEM || align=right | 2.0 km || 
|-id=537 bgcolor=#E9E9E9
| 292537 ||  || — || October 12, 2006 || Kitt Peak || Spacewatch || HOF || align=right | 3.2 km || 
|-id=538 bgcolor=#fefefe
| 292538 ||  || — || October 12, 2006 || Kitt Peak || Spacewatch || — || align=right data-sort-value="0.90" | 900 m || 
|-id=539 bgcolor=#E9E9E9
| 292539 ||  || — || October 12, 2006 || Kitt Peak || Spacewatch || — || align=right | 2.2 km || 
|-id=540 bgcolor=#fefefe
| 292540 ||  || — || October 12, 2006 || Kitt Peak || Spacewatch || NYS || align=right data-sort-value="0.72" | 720 m || 
|-id=541 bgcolor=#d6d6d6
| 292541 ||  || — || October 12, 2006 || Kitt Peak || Spacewatch || — || align=right | 2.9 km || 
|-id=542 bgcolor=#fefefe
| 292542 ||  || — || October 12, 2006 || Kitt Peak || Spacewatch || MAS || align=right data-sort-value="0.77" | 770 m || 
|-id=543 bgcolor=#fefefe
| 292543 ||  || — || October 12, 2006 || Palomar || NEAT || — || align=right | 1.1 km || 
|-id=544 bgcolor=#d6d6d6
| 292544 ||  || — || October 12, 2006 || Kitt Peak || Spacewatch || — || align=right | 4.4 km || 
|-id=545 bgcolor=#fefefe
| 292545 ||  || — || October 12, 2006 || Palomar || NEAT || SUL || align=right | 2.8 km || 
|-id=546 bgcolor=#fefefe
| 292546 ||  || — || October 12, 2006 || Palomar || NEAT || FLO || align=right data-sort-value="0.93" | 930 m || 
|-id=547 bgcolor=#d6d6d6
| 292547 ||  || — || October 12, 2006 || Palomar || NEAT || LIX || align=right | 4.6 km || 
|-id=548 bgcolor=#E9E9E9
| 292548 ||  || — || October 12, 2006 || Palomar || NEAT || — || align=right | 2.8 km || 
|-id=549 bgcolor=#E9E9E9
| 292549 ||  || — || October 13, 2006 || Kitt Peak || Spacewatch || AGN || align=right | 1.3 km || 
|-id=550 bgcolor=#fefefe
| 292550 ||  || — || October 14, 2006 || Bergisch Gladbach || W. Bickel || V || align=right data-sort-value="0.53" | 530 m || 
|-id=551 bgcolor=#d6d6d6
| 292551 ||  || — || October 3, 2006 || Catalina || CSS || — || align=right | 3.8 km || 
|-id=552 bgcolor=#d6d6d6
| 292552 ||  || — || October 10, 2006 || Palomar || NEAT || EOS || align=right | 2.2 km || 
|-id=553 bgcolor=#fefefe
| 292553 ||  || — || October 11, 2006 || Palomar || NEAT || V || align=right data-sort-value="0.83" | 830 m || 
|-id=554 bgcolor=#fefefe
| 292554 ||  || — || October 11, 2006 || Palomar || NEAT || V || align=right data-sort-value="0.85" | 850 m || 
|-id=555 bgcolor=#d6d6d6
| 292555 ||  || — || October 11, 2006 || Palomar || NEAT || — || align=right | 4.2 km || 
|-id=556 bgcolor=#d6d6d6
| 292556 ||  || — || October 11, 2006 || Palomar || NEAT || — || align=right | 3.1 km || 
|-id=557 bgcolor=#d6d6d6
| 292557 ||  || — || October 11, 2006 || Palomar || NEAT || — || align=right | 4.5 km || 
|-id=558 bgcolor=#E9E9E9
| 292558 ||  || — || October 11, 2006 || Palomar || NEAT || — || align=right | 1.4 km || 
|-id=559 bgcolor=#E9E9E9
| 292559 ||  || — || October 11, 2006 || Palomar || NEAT || — || align=right | 1.4 km || 
|-id=560 bgcolor=#d6d6d6
| 292560 ||  || — || October 11, 2006 || Palomar || NEAT || — || align=right | 3.2 km || 
|-id=561 bgcolor=#d6d6d6
| 292561 ||  || — || October 11, 2006 || Palomar || NEAT || EOS || align=right | 2.8 km || 
|-id=562 bgcolor=#fefefe
| 292562 ||  || — || October 11, 2006 || Palomar || NEAT || NYS || align=right data-sort-value="0.72" | 720 m || 
|-id=563 bgcolor=#d6d6d6
| 292563 ||  || — || October 11, 2006 || Palomar || NEAT || — || align=right | 4.2 km || 
|-id=564 bgcolor=#d6d6d6
| 292564 ||  || — || October 11, 2006 || Palomar || NEAT || — || align=right | 3.6 km || 
|-id=565 bgcolor=#d6d6d6
| 292565 ||  || — || October 11, 2006 || Palomar || NEAT || — || align=right | 3.1 km || 
|-id=566 bgcolor=#E9E9E9
| 292566 ||  || — || October 11, 2006 || Palomar || NEAT || — || align=right | 3.1 km || 
|-id=567 bgcolor=#E9E9E9
| 292567 ||  || — || October 11, 2006 || Palomar || NEAT || — || align=right | 1.9 km || 
|-id=568 bgcolor=#d6d6d6
| 292568 ||  || — || October 11, 2006 || Palomar || NEAT || — || align=right | 4.4 km || 
|-id=569 bgcolor=#d6d6d6
| 292569 ||  || — || October 11, 2006 || Palomar || NEAT || EUP || align=right | 6.0 km || 
|-id=570 bgcolor=#d6d6d6
| 292570 ||  || — || October 12, 2006 || Palomar || NEAT || — || align=right | 4.1 km || 
|-id=571 bgcolor=#d6d6d6
| 292571 ||  || — || October 13, 2006 || Kitt Peak || Spacewatch || — || align=right | 3.8 km || 
|-id=572 bgcolor=#d6d6d6
| 292572 ||  || — || October 13, 2006 || Kitt Peak || Spacewatch || — || align=right | 3.3 km || 
|-id=573 bgcolor=#d6d6d6
| 292573 ||  || — || October 13, 2006 || Kitt Peak || Spacewatch || HYG || align=right | 3.7 km || 
|-id=574 bgcolor=#d6d6d6
| 292574 ||  || — || October 13, 2006 || Kitt Peak || Spacewatch || — || align=right | 5.8 km || 
|-id=575 bgcolor=#d6d6d6
| 292575 ||  || — || October 13, 2006 || Kitt Peak || Spacewatch || — || align=right | 3.3 km || 
|-id=576 bgcolor=#E9E9E9
| 292576 ||  || — || October 13, 2006 || Kitt Peak || Spacewatch || — || align=right | 1.5 km || 
|-id=577 bgcolor=#E9E9E9
| 292577 ||  || — || October 13, 2006 || Kitt Peak || Spacewatch || MRX || align=right | 1.2 km || 
|-id=578 bgcolor=#d6d6d6
| 292578 ||  || — || October 13, 2006 || Kitt Peak || Spacewatch || EOS || align=right | 2.7 km || 
|-id=579 bgcolor=#d6d6d6
| 292579 ||  || — || October 13, 2006 || Kitt Peak || Spacewatch || — || align=right | 2.6 km || 
|-id=580 bgcolor=#fefefe
| 292580 ||  || — || October 13, 2006 || Kitt Peak || Spacewatch || — || align=right data-sort-value="0.87" | 870 m || 
|-id=581 bgcolor=#E9E9E9
| 292581 ||  || — || October 13, 2006 || Kitt Peak || Spacewatch || — || align=right | 1.7 km || 
|-id=582 bgcolor=#E9E9E9
| 292582 ||  || — || October 13, 2006 || Kitt Peak || Spacewatch || — || align=right | 1.9 km || 
|-id=583 bgcolor=#d6d6d6
| 292583 ||  || — || October 15, 2006 || Kitt Peak || Spacewatch || — || align=right | 3.6 km || 
|-id=584 bgcolor=#E9E9E9
| 292584 ||  || — || October 15, 2006 || Catalina || CSS || NEM || align=right | 2.8 km || 
|-id=585 bgcolor=#fefefe
| 292585 ||  || — || October 11, 2006 || Palomar || NEAT || H || align=right data-sort-value="0.55" | 550 m || 
|-id=586 bgcolor=#E9E9E9
| 292586 ||  || — || October 13, 2006 || Kitt Peak || Spacewatch || — || align=right | 1.2 km || 
|-id=587 bgcolor=#d6d6d6
| 292587 ||  || — || October 15, 2006 || Kitt Peak || Spacewatch || MRC || align=right | 3.1 km || 
|-id=588 bgcolor=#d6d6d6
| 292588 ||  || — || October 15, 2006 || Kitt Peak || Spacewatch || — || align=right | 3.7 km || 
|-id=589 bgcolor=#E9E9E9
| 292589 ||  || — || October 15, 2006 || Kitt Peak || Spacewatch || — || align=right | 2.0 km || 
|-id=590 bgcolor=#E9E9E9
| 292590 ||  || — || October 15, 2006 || Kitt Peak || Spacewatch || HOF || align=right | 2.7 km || 
|-id=591 bgcolor=#E9E9E9
| 292591 ||  || — || October 15, 2006 || Kitt Peak || Spacewatch || — || align=right | 1.9 km || 
|-id=592 bgcolor=#d6d6d6
| 292592 ||  || — || October 15, 2006 || Kitt Peak || Spacewatch || EOS || align=right | 2.3 km || 
|-id=593 bgcolor=#d6d6d6
| 292593 ||  || — || October 15, 2006 || Kitt Peak || Spacewatch || — || align=right | 3.4 km || 
|-id=594 bgcolor=#d6d6d6
| 292594 ||  || — || October 15, 2006 || Kitt Peak || Spacewatch || THM || align=right | 2.5 km || 
|-id=595 bgcolor=#fefefe
| 292595 ||  || — || October 15, 2006 || Kitt Peak || Spacewatch || NYS || align=right data-sort-value="0.73" | 730 m || 
|-id=596 bgcolor=#d6d6d6
| 292596 ||  || — || October 15, 2006 || Kitt Peak || Spacewatch || HYG || align=right | 3.8 km || 
|-id=597 bgcolor=#fefefe
| 292597 ||  || — || October 15, 2006 || Catalina || CSS || — || align=right data-sort-value="0.77" | 770 m || 
|-id=598 bgcolor=#d6d6d6
| 292598 ||  || — || October 15, 2006 || Lulin Observatory || C.-S. Lin, Q.-z. Ye || — || align=right | 3.1 km || 
|-id=599 bgcolor=#d6d6d6
| 292599 ||  || — || October 12, 2006 || Siding Spring || SSS || — || align=right | 5.4 km || 
|-id=600 bgcolor=#C2FFFF
| 292600 ||  || — || October 11, 2006 || Apache Point || SDSS || L4 || align=right | 11 km || 
|}

292601–292700 

|-bgcolor=#fefefe
| 292601 ||  || — || October 2, 2006 || Mount Lemmon || Mount Lemmon Survey || — || align=right data-sort-value="0.97" | 970 m || 
|-id=602 bgcolor=#d6d6d6
| 292602 ||  || — || October 2, 2006 || Catalina || CSS || — || align=right | 3.8 km || 
|-id=603 bgcolor=#E9E9E9
| 292603 ||  || — || October 2, 2006 || Mount Lemmon || Mount Lemmon Survey || INO || align=right | 1.4 km || 
|-id=604 bgcolor=#fefefe
| 292604 ||  || — || October 4, 2006 || Mount Lemmon || Mount Lemmon Survey || — || align=right data-sort-value="0.91" | 910 m || 
|-id=605 bgcolor=#d6d6d6
| 292605 ||  || — || October 1, 2006 || Apache Point || A. C. Becker || EOS || align=right | 2.7 km || 
|-id=606 bgcolor=#d6d6d6
| 292606 ||  || — || October 1, 2006 || Apache Point || A. C. Becker || — || align=right | 4.0 km || 
|-id=607 bgcolor=#d6d6d6
| 292607 ||  || — || October 2, 2006 || Apache Point || A. C. Becker || EOS || align=right | 2.4 km || 
|-id=608 bgcolor=#d6d6d6
| 292608 ||  || — || October 3, 2006 || Apache Point || A. C. Becker || — || align=right | 2.5 km || 
|-id=609 bgcolor=#d6d6d6
| 292609 ||  || — || October 12, 2006 || Apache Point || A. C. Becker || — || align=right | 3.8 km || 
|-id=610 bgcolor=#E9E9E9
| 292610 ||  || — || October 4, 2006 || Mount Lemmon || Mount Lemmon Survey || WIT || align=right | 1.0 km || 
|-id=611 bgcolor=#E9E9E9
| 292611 ||  || — || October 3, 2006 || Mount Lemmon || Mount Lemmon Survey || RAF || align=right | 1.4 km || 
|-id=612 bgcolor=#d6d6d6
| 292612 ||  || — || October 13, 2006 || Kitt Peak || Spacewatch || HYG || align=right | 3.9 km || 
|-id=613 bgcolor=#fefefe
| 292613 ||  || — || October 15, 2006 || Kitt Peak || Spacewatch || — || align=right data-sort-value="0.80" | 800 m || 
|-id=614 bgcolor=#E9E9E9
| 292614 ||  || — || October 2, 2006 || Mount Lemmon || Mount Lemmon Survey || MAR || align=right | 1.1 km || 
|-id=615 bgcolor=#E9E9E9
| 292615 ||  || — || October 16, 2006 || Altschwendt || W. Ries || — || align=right | 2.2 km || 
|-id=616 bgcolor=#d6d6d6
| 292616 ||  || — || October 16, 2006 || Piszkéstető || K. Sárneczky, Z. Kuli || EOS || align=right | 2.8 km || 
|-id=617 bgcolor=#d6d6d6
| 292617 ||  || — || October 16, 2006 || Mount Lemmon || Mount Lemmon Survey || — || align=right | 4.3 km || 
|-id=618 bgcolor=#d6d6d6
| 292618 ||  || — || October 16, 2006 || Catalina || CSS || THM || align=right | 2.8 km || 
|-id=619 bgcolor=#fefefe
| 292619 ||  || — || October 16, 2006 || Catalina || CSS || — || align=right data-sort-value="0.67" | 670 m || 
|-id=620 bgcolor=#fefefe
| 292620 ||  || — || October 16, 2006 || Catalina || CSS || MAS || align=right data-sort-value="0.83" | 830 m || 
|-id=621 bgcolor=#E9E9E9
| 292621 ||  || — || October 16, 2006 || Catalina || CSS || — || align=right | 2.1 km || 
|-id=622 bgcolor=#fefefe
| 292622 ||  || — || October 16, 2006 || Catalina || CSS || V || align=right data-sort-value="0.99" | 990 m || 
|-id=623 bgcolor=#d6d6d6
| 292623 ||  || — || October 16, 2006 || Catalina || CSS || — || align=right | 5.2 km || 
|-id=624 bgcolor=#d6d6d6
| 292624 ||  || — || October 16, 2006 || Catalina || CSS || HYG || align=right | 3.8 km || 
|-id=625 bgcolor=#fefefe
| 292625 ||  || — || October 16, 2006 || Bergisch Gladbac || W. Bickel || — || align=right data-sort-value="0.82" | 820 m || 
|-id=626 bgcolor=#E9E9E9
| 292626 ||  || — || October 16, 2006 || Kitt Peak || Spacewatch || — || align=right | 1.7 km || 
|-id=627 bgcolor=#d6d6d6
| 292627 ||  || — || October 16, 2006 || Kitt Peak || Spacewatch || — || align=right | 3.9 km || 
|-id=628 bgcolor=#d6d6d6
| 292628 ||  || — || October 16, 2006 || Kitt Peak || Spacewatch || — || align=right | 3.9 km || 
|-id=629 bgcolor=#fefefe
| 292629 ||  || — || October 16, 2006 || Kitt Peak || Spacewatch || — || align=right | 1.1 km || 
|-id=630 bgcolor=#fefefe
| 292630 ||  || — || October 16, 2006 || Calvin-Rehoboth || L. A. Molnar || NYS || align=right data-sort-value="0.57" | 570 m || 
|-id=631 bgcolor=#d6d6d6
| 292631 ||  || — || October 16, 2006 || Kitt Peak || Spacewatch || — || align=right | 3.9 km || 
|-id=632 bgcolor=#d6d6d6
| 292632 ||  || — || October 16, 2006 || Kitt Peak || Spacewatch || HYG || align=right | 2.9 km || 
|-id=633 bgcolor=#fefefe
| 292633 ||  || — || October 16, 2006 || Kitt Peak || Spacewatch || NYS || align=right data-sort-value="0.79" | 790 m || 
|-id=634 bgcolor=#d6d6d6
| 292634 ||  || — || October 16, 2006 || Kitt Peak || Spacewatch || KAR || align=right | 1.2 km || 
|-id=635 bgcolor=#E9E9E9
| 292635 ||  || — || October 16, 2006 || Kitt Peak || Spacewatch || — || align=right data-sort-value="0.94" | 940 m || 
|-id=636 bgcolor=#fefefe
| 292636 ||  || — || October 16, 2006 || Kitt Peak || Spacewatch || — || align=right data-sort-value="0.94" | 940 m || 
|-id=637 bgcolor=#d6d6d6
| 292637 ||  || — || October 16, 2006 || Kitt Peak || Spacewatch || HYG || align=right | 2.8 km || 
|-id=638 bgcolor=#d6d6d6
| 292638 ||  || — || October 16, 2006 || Kitt Peak || Spacewatch || KOR || align=right | 1.7 km || 
|-id=639 bgcolor=#fefefe
| 292639 ||  || — || October 16, 2006 || Kitt Peak || Spacewatch || — || align=right data-sort-value="0.75" | 750 m || 
|-id=640 bgcolor=#E9E9E9
| 292640 ||  || — || October 16, 2006 || Kitt Peak || Spacewatch || — || align=right | 4.8 km || 
|-id=641 bgcolor=#fefefe
| 292641 ||  || — || October 16, 2006 || Kitt Peak || Spacewatch || V || align=right data-sort-value="0.68" | 680 m || 
|-id=642 bgcolor=#fefefe
| 292642 ||  || — || October 16, 2006 || Kitt Peak || Spacewatch || — || align=right | 1.3 km || 
|-id=643 bgcolor=#d6d6d6
| 292643 ||  || — || October 16, 2006 || Kitt Peak || Spacewatch || — || align=right | 2.2 km || 
|-id=644 bgcolor=#fefefe
| 292644 ||  || — || October 16, 2006 || Kitt Peak || Spacewatch || — || align=right data-sort-value="0.65" | 650 m || 
|-id=645 bgcolor=#E9E9E9
| 292645 ||  || — || October 16, 2006 || Kitt Peak || Spacewatch || — || align=right | 1.0 km || 
|-id=646 bgcolor=#d6d6d6
| 292646 ||  || — || October 16, 2006 || Kitt Peak || Spacewatch || — || align=right | 3.3 km || 
|-id=647 bgcolor=#E9E9E9
| 292647 ||  || — || October 16, 2006 || Kitt Peak || Spacewatch || — || align=right | 1.4 km || 
|-id=648 bgcolor=#fefefe
| 292648 ||  || — || October 16, 2006 || Kitt Peak || Spacewatch || — || align=right data-sort-value="0.54" | 540 m || 
|-id=649 bgcolor=#d6d6d6
| 292649 ||  || — || October 16, 2006 || Kitt Peak || Spacewatch || BRA || align=right | 1.7 km || 
|-id=650 bgcolor=#E9E9E9
| 292650 ||  || — || October 17, 2006 || Mount Lemmon || Mount Lemmon Survey || — || align=right | 1.5 km || 
|-id=651 bgcolor=#E9E9E9
| 292651 ||  || — || October 17, 2006 || Kitt Peak || Spacewatch || — || align=right | 2.2 km || 
|-id=652 bgcolor=#d6d6d6
| 292652 ||  || — || October 17, 2006 || Kitt Peak || Spacewatch || — || align=right | 4.2 km || 
|-id=653 bgcolor=#fefefe
| 292653 ||  || — || October 17, 2006 || Mount Lemmon || Mount Lemmon Survey || — || align=right data-sort-value="0.89" | 890 m || 
|-id=654 bgcolor=#d6d6d6
| 292654 ||  || — || October 17, 2006 || Catalina || CSS || — || align=right | 2.9 km || 
|-id=655 bgcolor=#d6d6d6
| 292655 ||  || — || October 17, 2006 || Catalina || CSS || — || align=right | 3.4 km || 
|-id=656 bgcolor=#d6d6d6
| 292656 ||  || — || October 17, 2006 || Mount Lemmon || Mount Lemmon Survey || THM || align=right | 2.6 km || 
|-id=657 bgcolor=#d6d6d6
| 292657 ||  || — || October 17, 2006 || Mount Lemmon || Mount Lemmon Survey || — || align=right | 5.3 km || 
|-id=658 bgcolor=#d6d6d6
| 292658 ||  || — || October 17, 2006 || Catalina || CSS || — || align=right | 4.3 km || 
|-id=659 bgcolor=#fefefe
| 292659 ||  || — || October 18, 2006 || Kitt Peak || Spacewatch || V || align=right data-sort-value="0.71" | 710 m || 
|-id=660 bgcolor=#E9E9E9
| 292660 ||  || — || October 18, 2006 || Kitt Peak || Spacewatch || MIS || align=right | 2.8 km || 
|-id=661 bgcolor=#E9E9E9
| 292661 ||  || — || October 19, 2006 || Mount Lemmon || Mount Lemmon Survey || — || align=right | 3.0 km || 
|-id=662 bgcolor=#d6d6d6
| 292662 ||  || — || October 19, 2006 || Catalina || CSS || — || align=right | 4.4 km || 
|-id=663 bgcolor=#d6d6d6
| 292663 ||  || — || October 21, 2006 || Desert Moon || B. L. Stevens || — || align=right | 4.0 km || 
|-id=664 bgcolor=#d6d6d6
| 292664 ||  || — || October 16, 2006 || Mount Lemmon || Mount Lemmon Survey || KOR || align=right | 1.8 km || 
|-id=665 bgcolor=#fefefe
| 292665 ||  || — || October 16, 2006 || Kitt Peak || Spacewatch || V || align=right data-sort-value="0.59" | 590 m || 
|-id=666 bgcolor=#d6d6d6
| 292666 ||  || — || October 16, 2006 || Mount Lemmon || Mount Lemmon Survey || — || align=right | 3.4 km || 
|-id=667 bgcolor=#d6d6d6
| 292667 ||  || — || October 16, 2006 || Catalina || CSS || HYG || align=right | 3.6 km || 
|-id=668 bgcolor=#E9E9E9
| 292668 ||  || — || October 16, 2006 || Catalina || CSS || — || align=right | 1.7 km || 
|-id=669 bgcolor=#d6d6d6
| 292669 ||  || — || October 17, 2006 || Kitt Peak || Spacewatch || — || align=right | 2.9 km || 
|-id=670 bgcolor=#fefefe
| 292670 ||  || — || October 17, 2006 || Kitt Peak || Spacewatch || — || align=right | 1.0 km || 
|-id=671 bgcolor=#d6d6d6
| 292671 ||  || — || October 17, 2006 || Mount Lemmon || Mount Lemmon Survey || — || align=right | 2.6 km || 
|-id=672 bgcolor=#E9E9E9
| 292672 ||  || — || October 17, 2006 || Kitt Peak || Spacewatch || WIT || align=right data-sort-value="0.93" | 930 m || 
|-id=673 bgcolor=#d6d6d6
| 292673 ||  || — || October 17, 2006 || Kitt Peak || Spacewatch || — || align=right | 3.5 km || 
|-id=674 bgcolor=#fefefe
| 292674 ||  || — || October 17, 2006 || Kitt Peak || Spacewatch || — || align=right | 1.0 km || 
|-id=675 bgcolor=#d6d6d6
| 292675 ||  || — || October 17, 2006 || Kitt Peak || Spacewatch || — || align=right | 2.8 km || 
|-id=676 bgcolor=#fefefe
| 292676 ||  || — || October 17, 2006 || Mount Lemmon || Mount Lemmon Survey || — || align=right data-sort-value="0.79" | 790 m || 
|-id=677 bgcolor=#fefefe
| 292677 ||  || — || October 17, 2006 || Kitt Peak || Spacewatch || — || align=right | 1.1 km || 
|-id=678 bgcolor=#d6d6d6
| 292678 ||  || — || October 17, 2006 || Mount Lemmon || Mount Lemmon Survey || KAR || align=right | 1.1 km || 
|-id=679 bgcolor=#E9E9E9
| 292679 ||  || — || October 17, 2006 || Kitt Peak || Spacewatch || — || align=right | 2.9 km || 
|-id=680 bgcolor=#E9E9E9
| 292680 ||  || — || October 17, 2006 || Kitt Peak || Spacewatch || — || align=right | 1.2 km || 
|-id=681 bgcolor=#fefefe
| 292681 ||  || — || October 17, 2006 || Kitt Peak || Spacewatch || — || align=right data-sort-value="0.71" | 710 m || 
|-id=682 bgcolor=#d6d6d6
| 292682 ||  || — || October 18, 2006 || Kitt Peak || Spacewatch || — || align=right | 3.7 km || 
|-id=683 bgcolor=#d6d6d6
| 292683 ||  || — || October 18, 2006 || Kitt Peak || Spacewatch || — || align=right | 3.6 km || 
|-id=684 bgcolor=#fefefe
| 292684 ||  || — || October 18, 2006 || Kitt Peak || Spacewatch || — || align=right | 1.1 km || 
|-id=685 bgcolor=#fefefe
| 292685 ||  || — || October 18, 2006 || Kitt Peak || Spacewatch || — || align=right | 1.0 km || 
|-id=686 bgcolor=#fefefe
| 292686 ||  || — || October 18, 2006 || Kitt Peak || Spacewatch || — || align=right | 1.2 km || 
|-id=687 bgcolor=#E9E9E9
| 292687 ||  || — || October 18, 2006 || Kitt Peak || Spacewatch || HEN || align=right | 1.0 km || 
|-id=688 bgcolor=#E9E9E9
| 292688 ||  || — || October 18, 2006 || Kitt Peak || Spacewatch || HEN || align=right | 1.1 km || 
|-id=689 bgcolor=#E9E9E9
| 292689 ||  || — || October 18, 2006 || Kitt Peak || Spacewatch || MIS || align=right | 2.9 km || 
|-id=690 bgcolor=#E9E9E9
| 292690 ||  || — || October 18, 2006 || Kitt Peak || Spacewatch || — || align=right | 1.5 km || 
|-id=691 bgcolor=#d6d6d6
| 292691 ||  || — || October 18, 2006 || Kitt Peak || Spacewatch || EOS || align=right | 2.6 km || 
|-id=692 bgcolor=#E9E9E9
| 292692 ||  || — || October 18, 2006 || Kitt Peak || Spacewatch || — || align=right | 1.6 km || 
|-id=693 bgcolor=#E9E9E9
| 292693 ||  || — || October 19, 2006 || Kitt Peak || Spacewatch || — || align=right | 1.1 km || 
|-id=694 bgcolor=#E9E9E9
| 292694 ||  || — || October 19, 2006 || Kitt Peak || Spacewatch || — || align=right | 1.7 km || 
|-id=695 bgcolor=#d6d6d6
| 292695 ||  || — || October 19, 2006 || Kitt Peak || Spacewatch || — || align=right | 2.5 km || 
|-id=696 bgcolor=#E9E9E9
| 292696 ||  || — || October 19, 2006 || Kitt Peak || Spacewatch || — || align=right | 2.1 km || 
|-id=697 bgcolor=#E9E9E9
| 292697 ||  || — || October 19, 2006 || Kitt Peak || Spacewatch || — || align=right data-sort-value="0.87" | 870 m || 
|-id=698 bgcolor=#d6d6d6
| 292698 ||  || — || October 19, 2006 || Kitt Peak || Spacewatch || THM || align=right | 2.0 km || 
|-id=699 bgcolor=#E9E9E9
| 292699 ||  || — || October 19, 2006 || Kitt Peak || Spacewatch || — || align=right | 1.3 km || 
|-id=700 bgcolor=#E9E9E9
| 292700 ||  || — || October 19, 2006 || Kitt Peak || Spacewatch || DOR || align=right | 3.0 km || 
|}

292701–292800 

|-bgcolor=#E9E9E9
| 292701 ||  || — || October 19, 2006 || Kitt Peak || Spacewatch || KON || align=right | 2.7 km || 
|-id=702 bgcolor=#fefefe
| 292702 ||  || — || October 19, 2006 || Kitt Peak || Spacewatch || — || align=right data-sort-value="0.93" | 930 m || 
|-id=703 bgcolor=#E9E9E9
| 292703 ||  || — || October 19, 2006 || Kitt Peak || Spacewatch || — || align=right data-sort-value="0.90" | 900 m || 
|-id=704 bgcolor=#fefefe
| 292704 ||  || — || October 19, 2006 || Kitt Peak || Spacewatch || — || align=right data-sort-value="0.81" | 810 m || 
|-id=705 bgcolor=#fefefe
| 292705 ||  || — || October 19, 2006 || Mount Lemmon || Mount Lemmon Survey || — || align=right | 1.0 km || 
|-id=706 bgcolor=#d6d6d6
| 292706 ||  || — || October 19, 2006 || Mount Lemmon || Mount Lemmon Survey || — || align=right | 4.4 km || 
|-id=707 bgcolor=#d6d6d6
| 292707 ||  || — || October 19, 2006 || Kitt Peak || Spacewatch || HYG || align=right | 3.0 km || 
|-id=708 bgcolor=#E9E9E9
| 292708 ||  || — || October 19, 2006 || Kitt Peak || Spacewatch || — || align=right | 2.4 km || 
|-id=709 bgcolor=#fefefe
| 292709 ||  || — || October 19, 2006 || Kitt Peak || Spacewatch || — || align=right data-sort-value="0.91" | 910 m || 
|-id=710 bgcolor=#E9E9E9
| 292710 ||  || — || October 19, 2006 || Catalina || CSS || EUN || align=right | 1.4 km || 
|-id=711 bgcolor=#E9E9E9
| 292711 ||  || — || October 19, 2006 || Kitt Peak || Spacewatch || JUL || align=right | 1.1 km || 
|-id=712 bgcolor=#fefefe
| 292712 ||  || — || October 19, 2006 || Kitt Peak || Spacewatch || MAS || align=right data-sort-value="0.62" | 620 m || 
|-id=713 bgcolor=#E9E9E9
| 292713 ||  || — || October 19, 2006 || Kitt Peak || Spacewatch || — || align=right | 1.6 km || 
|-id=714 bgcolor=#d6d6d6
| 292714 ||  || — || October 19, 2006 || Kitt Peak || Spacewatch || — || align=right | 4.0 km || 
|-id=715 bgcolor=#fefefe
| 292715 ||  || — || October 19, 2006 || Catalina || CSS || FLO || align=right data-sort-value="0.75" | 750 m || 
|-id=716 bgcolor=#d6d6d6
| 292716 ||  || — || October 19, 2006 || Kitt Peak || Spacewatch || — || align=right | 3.6 km || 
|-id=717 bgcolor=#fefefe
| 292717 ||  || — || October 19, 2006 || Kitt Peak || Spacewatch || MAS || align=right data-sort-value="0.66" | 660 m || 
|-id=718 bgcolor=#d6d6d6
| 292718 ||  || — || October 19, 2006 || Mount Lemmon || Mount Lemmon Survey || — || align=right | 4.5 km || 
|-id=719 bgcolor=#E9E9E9
| 292719 ||  || — || October 19, 2006 || Mount Lemmon || Mount Lemmon Survey || — || align=right | 1.4 km || 
|-id=720 bgcolor=#E9E9E9
| 292720 ||  || — || October 19, 2006 || Kitt Peak || Spacewatch || ADE || align=right | 3.7 km || 
|-id=721 bgcolor=#E9E9E9
| 292721 ||  || — || October 19, 2006 || Kitt Peak || Spacewatch || — || align=right | 1.6 km || 
|-id=722 bgcolor=#E9E9E9
| 292722 ||  || — || October 19, 2006 || Kitt Peak || Spacewatch || EUN || align=right | 1.9 km || 
|-id=723 bgcolor=#E9E9E9
| 292723 ||  || — || October 19, 2006 || Kitt Peak || Spacewatch || — || align=right | 1.8 km || 
|-id=724 bgcolor=#fefefe
| 292724 ||  || — || October 19, 2006 || Kitt Peak || Spacewatch || V || align=right data-sort-value="0.64" | 640 m || 
|-id=725 bgcolor=#d6d6d6
| 292725 ||  || — || October 19, 2006 || Mount Lemmon || Mount Lemmon Survey || — || align=right | 3.3 km || 
|-id=726 bgcolor=#d6d6d6
| 292726 ||  || — || October 19, 2006 || Kitt Peak || Spacewatch || HYG || align=right | 3.7 km || 
|-id=727 bgcolor=#E9E9E9
| 292727 ||  || — || October 19, 2006 || Kitt Peak || Spacewatch || MRX || align=right | 1.1 km || 
|-id=728 bgcolor=#E9E9E9
| 292728 ||  || — || October 19, 2006 || Kitt Peak || Spacewatch || — || align=right | 1.3 km || 
|-id=729 bgcolor=#E9E9E9
| 292729 ||  || — || October 19, 2006 || Palomar || NEAT || DOR || align=right | 3.8 km || 
|-id=730 bgcolor=#fefefe
| 292730 ||  || — || October 21, 2006 || Kitt Peak || Spacewatch || V || align=right data-sort-value="0.76" | 760 m || 
|-id=731 bgcolor=#d6d6d6
| 292731 ||  || — || October 21, 2006 || Catalina || CSS || — || align=right | 2.8 km || 
|-id=732 bgcolor=#d6d6d6
| 292732 ||  || — || October 21, 2006 || Mount Lemmon || Mount Lemmon Survey || BRA || align=right | 2.0 km || 
|-id=733 bgcolor=#d6d6d6
| 292733 ||  || — || October 21, 2006 || Mount Lemmon || Mount Lemmon Survey || — || align=right | 3.3 km || 
|-id=734 bgcolor=#d6d6d6
| 292734 ||  || — || October 21, 2006 || Mount Lemmon || Mount Lemmon Survey || — || align=right | 2.5 km || 
|-id=735 bgcolor=#d6d6d6
| 292735 ||  || — || October 21, 2006 || Mount Lemmon || Mount Lemmon Survey || NAE || align=right | 2.3 km || 
|-id=736 bgcolor=#E9E9E9
| 292736 ||  || — || October 21, 2006 || Mount Lemmon || Mount Lemmon Survey || HEN || align=right | 1.1 km || 
|-id=737 bgcolor=#d6d6d6
| 292737 ||  || — || October 21, 2006 || Mount Lemmon || Mount Lemmon Survey || — || align=right | 4.8 km || 
|-id=738 bgcolor=#E9E9E9
| 292738 ||  || — || October 21, 2006 || Mount Lemmon || Mount Lemmon Survey || MRX || align=right | 1.2 km || 
|-id=739 bgcolor=#E9E9E9
| 292739 ||  || — || October 21, 2006 || Mount Lemmon || Mount Lemmon Survey || — || align=right | 1.6 km || 
|-id=740 bgcolor=#E9E9E9
| 292740 ||  || — || October 21, 2006 || Mount Lemmon || Mount Lemmon Survey || — || align=right | 1.2 km || 
|-id=741 bgcolor=#d6d6d6
| 292741 ||  || — || October 21, 2006 || Mount Lemmon || Mount Lemmon Survey || — || align=right | 4.2 km || 
|-id=742 bgcolor=#E9E9E9
| 292742 ||  || — || October 22, 2006 || Kitt Peak || Spacewatch || — || align=right | 1.5 km || 
|-id=743 bgcolor=#fefefe
| 292743 ||  || — || October 22, 2006 || Mount Lemmon || Mount Lemmon Survey || — || align=right | 1.0 km || 
|-id=744 bgcolor=#E9E9E9
| 292744 ||  || — || October 22, 2006 || Mount Lemmon || Mount Lemmon Survey || — || align=right | 1.3 km || 
|-id=745 bgcolor=#E9E9E9
| 292745 ||  || — || October 19, 2006 || Catalina || CSS || MRX || align=right | 1.4 km || 
|-id=746 bgcolor=#E9E9E9
| 292746 ||  || — || October 16, 2006 || Bergisch Gladbac || W. Bickel || HEN || align=right | 1.4 km || 
|-id=747 bgcolor=#d6d6d6
| 292747 ||  || — || October 16, 2006 || Catalina || CSS || — || align=right | 3.3 km || 
|-id=748 bgcolor=#d6d6d6
| 292748 ||  || — || October 16, 2006 || Catalina || CSS || — || align=right | 4.3 km || 
|-id=749 bgcolor=#E9E9E9
| 292749 ||  || — || October 16, 2006 || Catalina || CSS || — || align=right | 1.4 km || 
|-id=750 bgcolor=#d6d6d6
| 292750 ||  || — || October 16, 2006 || Catalina || CSS || HYG || align=right | 3.8 km || 
|-id=751 bgcolor=#d6d6d6
| 292751 ||  || — || October 16, 2006 || Catalina || CSS || NAE || align=right | 3.3 km || 
|-id=752 bgcolor=#E9E9E9
| 292752 ||  || — || October 16, 2006 || Catalina || CSS || — || align=right | 2.3 km || 
|-id=753 bgcolor=#d6d6d6
| 292753 ||  || — || October 17, 2006 || Catalina || CSS || — || align=right | 3.8 km || 
|-id=754 bgcolor=#fefefe
| 292754 ||  || — || October 19, 2006 || Palomar || NEAT || — || align=right | 1.0 km || 
|-id=755 bgcolor=#d6d6d6
| 292755 ||  || — || October 17, 2006 || Catalina || CSS || — || align=right | 4.8 km || 
|-id=756 bgcolor=#d6d6d6
| 292756 ||  || — || October 17, 2006 || Catalina || CSS || — || align=right | 4.3 km || 
|-id=757 bgcolor=#d6d6d6
| 292757 ||  || — || October 17, 2006 || Catalina || CSS || — || align=right | 4.3 km || 
|-id=758 bgcolor=#d6d6d6
| 292758 ||  || — || October 17, 2006 || Catalina || CSS || EMA || align=right | 4.9 km || 
|-id=759 bgcolor=#d6d6d6
| 292759 ||  || — || October 17, 2006 || Catalina || CSS || — || align=right | 5.0 km || 
|-id=760 bgcolor=#fefefe
| 292760 ||  || — || October 17, 2006 || Kitt Peak || Spacewatch || NYS || align=right data-sort-value="0.75" | 750 m || 
|-id=761 bgcolor=#d6d6d6
| 292761 ||  || — || October 19, 2006 || Catalina || CSS || — || align=right | 3.0 km || 
|-id=762 bgcolor=#E9E9E9
| 292762 ||  || — || October 19, 2006 || Catalina || CSS || MAR || align=right | 1.4 km || 
|-id=763 bgcolor=#E9E9E9
| 292763 ||  || — || October 19, 2006 || Catalina || CSS || — || align=right | 2.7 km || 
|-id=764 bgcolor=#d6d6d6
| 292764 ||  || — || October 19, 2006 || Catalina || CSS || — || align=right | 2.7 km || 
|-id=765 bgcolor=#d6d6d6
| 292765 ||  || — || October 19, 2006 || Catalina || CSS || EOS || align=right | 2.7 km || 
|-id=766 bgcolor=#d6d6d6
| 292766 ||  || — || October 20, 2006 || Kitt Peak || Spacewatch || — || align=right | 4.9 km || 
|-id=767 bgcolor=#d6d6d6
| 292767 ||  || — || October 20, 2006 || Kitt Peak || Spacewatch || — || align=right | 5.3 km || 
|-id=768 bgcolor=#E9E9E9
| 292768 ||  || — || October 21, 2006 || Catalina || CSS || — || align=right | 3.6 km || 
|-id=769 bgcolor=#d6d6d6
| 292769 ||  || — || October 21, 2006 || Kitt Peak || Spacewatch || — || align=right | 3.6 km || 
|-id=770 bgcolor=#d6d6d6
| 292770 ||  || — || October 22, 2006 || Palomar || NEAT || — || align=right | 3.5 km || 
|-id=771 bgcolor=#d6d6d6
| 292771 ||  || — || October 22, 2006 || Kitt Peak || Spacewatch || — || align=right | 4.5 km || 
|-id=772 bgcolor=#E9E9E9
| 292772 ||  || — || October 22, 2006 || Palomar || NEAT || — || align=right | 2.9 km || 
|-id=773 bgcolor=#fefefe
| 292773 ||  || — || October 23, 2006 || Kitt Peak || Spacewatch || — || align=right data-sort-value="0.78" | 780 m || 
|-id=774 bgcolor=#fefefe
| 292774 ||  || — || October 23, 2006 || Kitt Peak || Spacewatch || FLO || align=right data-sort-value="0.62" | 620 m || 
|-id=775 bgcolor=#d6d6d6
| 292775 ||  || — || October 23, 2006 || Kitt Peak || Spacewatch || — || align=right | 2.3 km || 
|-id=776 bgcolor=#d6d6d6
| 292776 ||  || — || October 23, 2006 || Kitt Peak || Spacewatch || — || align=right | 3.5 km || 
|-id=777 bgcolor=#E9E9E9
| 292777 ||  || — || October 23, 2006 || Kitt Peak || Spacewatch || HOF || align=right | 2.8 km || 
|-id=778 bgcolor=#fefefe
| 292778 ||  || — || October 23, 2006 || Kitt Peak || Spacewatch || — || align=right | 1.2 km || 
|-id=779 bgcolor=#d6d6d6
| 292779 ||  || — || October 26, 2006 || Kitami || K. Endate || — || align=right | 3.8 km || 
|-id=780 bgcolor=#E9E9E9
| 292780 ||  || — || October 27, 2006 || Calvin-Rehoboth || L. A. Molnar || — || align=right | 1.5 km || 
|-id=781 bgcolor=#E9E9E9
| 292781 ||  || — || October 27, 2006 || Mount Lemmon || Mount Lemmon Survey || — || align=right | 1.7 km || 
|-id=782 bgcolor=#d6d6d6
| 292782 ||  || — || October 16, 2006 || Kitt Peak || Spacewatch || — || align=right | 3.9 km || 
|-id=783 bgcolor=#fefefe
| 292783 ||  || — || October 16, 2006 || Catalina || CSS || — || align=right data-sort-value="0.80" | 800 m || 
|-id=784 bgcolor=#fefefe
| 292784 ||  || — || October 16, 2006 || Kitt Peak || Spacewatch || — || align=right data-sort-value="0.89" | 890 m || 
|-id=785 bgcolor=#d6d6d6
| 292785 ||  || — || October 17, 2006 || Kitt Peak || Spacewatch || EOS || align=right | 3.0 km || 
|-id=786 bgcolor=#fefefe
| 292786 ||  || — || October 17, 2006 || Catalina || CSS || — || align=right data-sort-value="0.95" | 950 m || 
|-id=787 bgcolor=#d6d6d6
| 292787 ||  || — || October 17, 2006 || Catalina || CSS || HYG || align=right | 4.4 km || 
|-id=788 bgcolor=#d6d6d6
| 292788 ||  || — || October 17, 2006 || Catalina || CSS || — || align=right | 4.3 km || 
|-id=789 bgcolor=#d6d6d6
| 292789 ||  || — || October 17, 2006 || Catalina || CSS || VER || align=right | 4.1 km || 
|-id=790 bgcolor=#E9E9E9
| 292790 ||  || — || October 19, 2006 || Palomar || NEAT || — || align=right data-sort-value="0.98" | 980 m || 
|-id=791 bgcolor=#d6d6d6
| 292791 ||  || — || October 19, 2006 || Catalina || CSS || EOS || align=right | 2.5 km || 
|-id=792 bgcolor=#d6d6d6
| 292792 ||  || — || October 19, 2006 || Kitt Peak || Spacewatch || — || align=right | 3.9 km || 
|-id=793 bgcolor=#fefefe
| 292793 ||  || — || October 20, 2006 || Kitt Peak || Spacewatch || — || align=right data-sort-value="0.87" | 870 m || 
|-id=794 bgcolor=#d6d6d6
| 292794 ||  || — || October 20, 2006 || Kitt Peak || Spacewatch || — || align=right | 3.7 km || 
|-id=795 bgcolor=#fefefe
| 292795 ||  || — || October 20, 2006 || Palomar || NEAT || — || align=right | 1.3 km || 
|-id=796 bgcolor=#fefefe
| 292796 ||  || — || October 20, 2006 || Palomar || NEAT || FLO || align=right | 1.0 km || 
|-id=797 bgcolor=#d6d6d6
| 292797 ||  || — || October 21, 2006 || Palomar || NEAT || — || align=right | 3.6 km || 
|-id=798 bgcolor=#d6d6d6
| 292798 ||  || — || October 22, 2006 || Mount Lemmon || Mount Lemmon Survey || — || align=right | 3.4 km || 
|-id=799 bgcolor=#d6d6d6
| 292799 ||  || — || October 22, 2006 || Kitt Peak || Spacewatch || — || align=right | 3.5 km || 
|-id=800 bgcolor=#E9E9E9
| 292800 ||  || — || October 23, 2006 || Kitt Peak || Spacewatch || — || align=right | 1.3 km || 
|}

292801–292900 

|-bgcolor=#d6d6d6
| 292801 ||  || — || October 23, 2006 || Mount Lemmon || Mount Lemmon Survey || HYG || align=right | 4.3 km || 
|-id=802 bgcolor=#d6d6d6
| 292802 ||  || — || October 27, 2006 || Kitt Peak || Spacewatch || — || align=right | 5.1 km || 
|-id=803 bgcolor=#d6d6d6
| 292803 ||  || — || October 27, 2006 || Mount Lemmon || Mount Lemmon Survey || — || align=right | 3.4 km || 
|-id=804 bgcolor=#E9E9E9
| 292804 ||  || — || October 27, 2006 || Mount Lemmon || Mount Lemmon Survey || — || align=right | 2.3 km || 
|-id=805 bgcolor=#d6d6d6
| 292805 ||  || — || October 27, 2006 || Mount Lemmon || Mount Lemmon Survey || — || align=right | 2.6 km || 
|-id=806 bgcolor=#E9E9E9
| 292806 ||  || — || October 27, 2006 || Mount Lemmon || Mount Lemmon Survey || — || align=right | 1.9 km || 
|-id=807 bgcolor=#d6d6d6
| 292807 ||  || — || October 27, 2006 || Mount Lemmon || Mount Lemmon Survey || — || align=right | 3.1 km || 
|-id=808 bgcolor=#fefefe
| 292808 ||  || — || October 27, 2006 || Mount Lemmon || Mount Lemmon Survey || NYS || align=right data-sort-value="0.77" | 770 m || 
|-id=809 bgcolor=#d6d6d6
| 292809 ||  || — || October 27, 2006 || Mount Lemmon || Mount Lemmon Survey || — || align=right | 3.6 km || 
|-id=810 bgcolor=#E9E9E9
| 292810 ||  || — || October 27, 2006 || Mount Lemmon || Mount Lemmon Survey || — || align=right | 1.3 km || 
|-id=811 bgcolor=#d6d6d6
| 292811 ||  || — || October 27, 2006 || Mount Lemmon || Mount Lemmon Survey || — || align=right | 2.4 km || 
|-id=812 bgcolor=#E9E9E9
| 292812 ||  || — || October 27, 2006 || Mount Lemmon || Mount Lemmon Survey || — || align=right | 3.5 km || 
|-id=813 bgcolor=#E9E9E9
| 292813 ||  || — || October 27, 2006 || Mount Lemmon || Mount Lemmon Survey || — || align=right | 3.1 km || 
|-id=814 bgcolor=#d6d6d6
| 292814 ||  || — || October 27, 2006 || Mount Lemmon || Mount Lemmon Survey || — || align=right | 3.1 km || 
|-id=815 bgcolor=#fefefe
| 292815 ||  || — || October 27, 2006 || Mount Lemmon || Mount Lemmon Survey || — || align=right data-sort-value="0.79" | 790 m || 
|-id=816 bgcolor=#fefefe
| 292816 ||  || — || October 27, 2006 || Mount Lemmon || Mount Lemmon Survey || NYS || align=right data-sort-value="0.78" | 780 m || 
|-id=817 bgcolor=#E9E9E9
| 292817 ||  || — || October 27, 2006 || Mount Lemmon || Mount Lemmon Survey || — || align=right | 2.0 km || 
|-id=818 bgcolor=#fefefe
| 292818 ||  || — || October 28, 2006 || Mount Lemmon || Mount Lemmon Survey || — || align=right | 1.1 km || 
|-id=819 bgcolor=#FA8072
| 292819 ||  || — || October 28, 2006 || Catalina || CSS || — || align=right | 1.0 km || 
|-id=820 bgcolor=#fefefe
| 292820 ||  || — || October 28, 2006 || Mount Lemmon || Mount Lemmon Survey || NYS || align=right data-sort-value="0.87" | 870 m || 
|-id=821 bgcolor=#fefefe
| 292821 ||  || — || October 27, 2006 || Mount Lemmon || Mount Lemmon Survey || MAS || align=right data-sort-value="0.67" | 670 m || 
|-id=822 bgcolor=#E9E9E9
| 292822 ||  || — || October 27, 2006 || Kitt Peak || Spacewatch || NEM || align=right | 2.5 km || 
|-id=823 bgcolor=#d6d6d6
| 292823 ||  || — || October 27, 2006 || Kitt Peak || Spacewatch || — || align=right | 5.2 km || 
|-id=824 bgcolor=#E9E9E9
| 292824 ||  || — || October 27, 2006 || Mount Lemmon || Mount Lemmon Survey || — || align=right | 2.7 km || 
|-id=825 bgcolor=#d6d6d6
| 292825 ||  || — || October 27, 2006 || Mount Lemmon || Mount Lemmon Survey || — || align=right | 3.0 km || 
|-id=826 bgcolor=#d6d6d6
| 292826 ||  || — || October 27, 2006 || Kitt Peak || Spacewatch || EMA || align=right | 4.4 km || 
|-id=827 bgcolor=#fefefe
| 292827 ||  || — || October 27, 2006 || Kitt Peak || Spacewatch || — || align=right data-sort-value="0.94" | 940 m || 
|-id=828 bgcolor=#d6d6d6
| 292828 ||  || — || October 27, 2006 || Kitt Peak || Spacewatch || — || align=right | 4.5 km || 
|-id=829 bgcolor=#E9E9E9
| 292829 ||  || — || October 27, 2006 || Kitt Peak || Spacewatch || — || align=right | 2.6 km || 
|-id=830 bgcolor=#d6d6d6
| 292830 ||  || — || October 28, 2006 || Kitt Peak || Spacewatch || — || align=right | 3.4 km || 
|-id=831 bgcolor=#d6d6d6
| 292831 ||  || — || October 28, 2006 || Kitt Peak || Spacewatch || KOR || align=right | 1.7 km || 
|-id=832 bgcolor=#fefefe
| 292832 ||  || — || October 28, 2006 || Mount Lemmon || Mount Lemmon Survey || — || align=right | 1.0 km || 
|-id=833 bgcolor=#fefefe
| 292833 ||  || — || October 28, 2006 || Mount Lemmon || Mount Lemmon Survey || — || align=right data-sort-value="0.95" | 950 m || 
|-id=834 bgcolor=#E9E9E9
| 292834 ||  || — || October 28, 2006 || Mount Lemmon || Mount Lemmon Survey || — || align=right | 1.7 km || 
|-id=835 bgcolor=#fefefe
| 292835 ||  || — || October 28, 2006 || Kitt Peak || Spacewatch || NYS || align=right data-sort-value="0.84" | 840 m || 
|-id=836 bgcolor=#fefefe
| 292836 ||  || — || October 28, 2006 || Kitt Peak || Spacewatch || — || align=right data-sort-value="0.97" | 970 m || 
|-id=837 bgcolor=#E9E9E9
| 292837 ||  || — || October 28, 2006 || Kitt Peak || Spacewatch || — || align=right | 2.9 km || 
|-id=838 bgcolor=#d6d6d6
| 292838 ||  || — || October 28, 2006 || Kitt Peak || Spacewatch || — || align=right | 4.8 km || 
|-id=839 bgcolor=#d6d6d6
| 292839 ||  || — || October 28, 2006 || Mount Lemmon || Mount Lemmon Survey || — || align=right | 3.4 km || 
|-id=840 bgcolor=#E9E9E9
| 292840 ||  || — || October 31, 2006 || Kitt Peak || Spacewatch || — || align=right | 1.7 km || 
|-id=841 bgcolor=#fefefe
| 292841 ||  || — || October 31, 2006 || Kitt Peak || Spacewatch || V || align=right | 1.00 km || 
|-id=842 bgcolor=#E9E9E9
| 292842 ||  || — || October 19, 2006 || Kitt Peak || M. W. Buie || AGN || align=right | 1.5 km || 
|-id=843 bgcolor=#E9E9E9
| 292843 ||  || — || October 19, 2006 || Kitt Peak || M. W. Buie || HOF || align=right | 3.7 km || 
|-id=844 bgcolor=#d6d6d6
| 292844 ||  || — || October 19, 2006 || Kitt Peak || M. W. Buie || — || align=right | 2.2 km || 
|-id=845 bgcolor=#E9E9E9
| 292845 ||  || — || October 20, 2006 || Kitt Peak || M. W. Buie || WIT || align=right data-sort-value="0.93" | 930 m || 
|-id=846 bgcolor=#E9E9E9
| 292846 ||  || — || October 28, 2006 || Mount Lemmon || Mount Lemmon Survey || — || align=right | 2.2 km || 
|-id=847 bgcolor=#fefefe
| 292847 ||  || — || October 19, 2006 || Kitt Peak || Spacewatch || — || align=right data-sort-value="0.73" | 730 m || 
|-id=848 bgcolor=#E9E9E9
| 292848 ||  || — || October 21, 2006 || Mount Lemmon || Mount Lemmon Survey || NEM || align=right | 2.5 km || 
|-id=849 bgcolor=#d6d6d6
| 292849 ||  || — || October 22, 2006 || Kitt Peak || Spacewatch || — || align=right | 4.7 km || 
|-id=850 bgcolor=#fefefe
| 292850 ||  || — || October 22, 2006 || Mount Lemmon || Mount Lemmon Survey || — || align=right data-sort-value="0.73" | 730 m || 
|-id=851 bgcolor=#d6d6d6
| 292851 ||  || — || October 21, 2006 || Apache Point || A. C. Becker || — || align=right | 2.9 km || 
|-id=852 bgcolor=#fefefe
| 292852 ||  || — || October 20, 2006 || Mount Lemmon || Mount Lemmon Survey || V || align=right data-sort-value="0.89" | 890 m || 
|-id=853 bgcolor=#fefefe
| 292853 ||  || — || October 21, 2006 || Kitt Peak || Spacewatch || V || align=right data-sort-value="0.62" | 620 m || 
|-id=854 bgcolor=#d6d6d6
| 292854 ||  || — || October 28, 2006 || Mount Lemmon || Mount Lemmon Survey || — || align=right | 3.8 km || 
|-id=855 bgcolor=#fefefe
| 292855 ||  || — || October 31, 2006 || Mount Lemmon || Mount Lemmon Survey || MAS || align=right | 1.0 km || 
|-id=856 bgcolor=#fefefe
| 292856 ||  || — || October 26, 2006 || Mauna Kea || P. A. Wiegert || — || align=right | 1.0 km || 
|-id=857 bgcolor=#E9E9E9
| 292857 ||  || — || October 18, 2006 || Kitt Peak || Spacewatch || — || align=right | 2.7 km || 
|-id=858 bgcolor=#E9E9E9
| 292858 ||  || — || October 23, 2006 || Mount Lemmon || Mount Lemmon Survey || — || align=right | 3.4 km || 
|-id=859 bgcolor=#E9E9E9
| 292859 ||  || — || October 22, 2006 || Catalina || CSS || — || align=right | 1.5 km || 
|-id=860 bgcolor=#fefefe
| 292860 ||  || — || November 1, 2006 || Mount Lemmon || Mount Lemmon Survey || — || align=right | 1.1 km || 
|-id=861 bgcolor=#E9E9E9
| 292861 ||  || — || November 1, 2006 || Kitt Peak || Spacewatch || — || align=right | 2.5 km || 
|-id=862 bgcolor=#E9E9E9
| 292862 ||  || — || November 1, 2006 || Mount Lemmon || Mount Lemmon Survey || — || align=right | 1.2 km || 
|-id=863 bgcolor=#d6d6d6
| 292863 ||  || — || November 3, 2006 || Charleston || ARO || — || align=right | 4.3 km || 
|-id=864 bgcolor=#fefefe
| 292864 ||  || — || November 9, 2006 || Kitt Peak || Spacewatch || MAS || align=right data-sort-value="0.69" | 690 m || 
|-id=865 bgcolor=#d6d6d6
| 292865 ||  || — || November 9, 2006 || Kitt Peak || Spacewatch || — || align=right | 5.0 km || 
|-id=866 bgcolor=#E9E9E9
| 292866 ||  || — || November 9, 2006 || Kitt Peak || Spacewatch || — || align=right | 1.4 km || 
|-id=867 bgcolor=#d6d6d6
| 292867 ||  || — || November 9, 2006 || Lulin Observatory || H.-C. Lin, Q.-z. Ye || — || align=right | 4.7 km || 
|-id=868 bgcolor=#E9E9E9
| 292868 ||  || — || November 10, 2006 || Kitt Peak || Spacewatch || AGN || align=right | 1.6 km || 
|-id=869 bgcolor=#E9E9E9
| 292869 ||  || — || November 10, 2006 || Kitt Peak || Spacewatch || — || align=right | 1.1 km || 
|-id=870 bgcolor=#E9E9E9
| 292870 ||  || — || November 11, 2006 || Kitt Peak || Spacewatch || — || align=right | 1.6 km || 
|-id=871 bgcolor=#fefefe
| 292871 ||  || — || November 11, 2006 || Mount Lemmon || Mount Lemmon Survey || — || align=right data-sort-value="0.96" | 960 m || 
|-id=872 bgcolor=#d6d6d6
| 292872 Anoushankar ||  ||  || November 12, 2006 || Vallemare di Borbona || V. S. Casulli || — || align=right | 4.0 km || 
|-id=873 bgcolor=#fefefe
| 292873 ||  || — || November 9, 2006 || Kitt Peak || Spacewatch || — || align=right data-sort-value="0.62" | 620 m || 
|-id=874 bgcolor=#E9E9E9
| 292874 ||  || — || November 9, 2006 || Kitt Peak || Spacewatch || — || align=right | 3.5 km || 
|-id=875 bgcolor=#E9E9E9
| 292875 ||  || — || November 9, 2006 || Kitt Peak || Spacewatch || MRX || align=right | 1.4 km || 
|-id=876 bgcolor=#E9E9E9
| 292876 ||  || — || November 9, 2006 || Kitt Peak || Spacewatch || — || align=right data-sort-value="0.78" | 780 m || 
|-id=877 bgcolor=#fefefe
| 292877 ||  || — || November 9, 2006 || Kitt Peak || Spacewatch || — || align=right data-sort-value="0.73" | 730 m || 
|-id=878 bgcolor=#fefefe
| 292878 ||  || — || November 9, 2006 || Kitt Peak || Spacewatch || V || align=right data-sort-value="0.79" | 790 m || 
|-id=879 bgcolor=#fefefe
| 292879 ||  || — || November 9, 2006 || Kitt Peak || Spacewatch || — || align=right | 1.1 km || 
|-id=880 bgcolor=#d6d6d6
| 292880 ||  || — || November 9, 2006 || Lulin || H.-C. Lin, Q.-z. Ye || EOS || align=right | 3.2 km || 
|-id=881 bgcolor=#E9E9E9
| 292881 ||  || — || November 10, 2006 || Kitt Peak || Spacewatch || — || align=right | 1.8 km || 
|-id=882 bgcolor=#E9E9E9
| 292882 ||  || — || November 10, 2006 || Kitt Peak || Spacewatch || — || align=right | 2.5 km || 
|-id=883 bgcolor=#d6d6d6
| 292883 ||  || — || November 10, 2006 || Kitt Peak || Spacewatch || — || align=right | 3.0 km || 
|-id=884 bgcolor=#E9E9E9
| 292884 ||  || — || November 10, 2006 || Kitt Peak || Spacewatch || MRX || align=right | 1.3 km || 
|-id=885 bgcolor=#d6d6d6
| 292885 ||  || — || November 10, 2006 || Kitt Peak || Spacewatch || — || align=right | 3.4 km || 
|-id=886 bgcolor=#d6d6d6
| 292886 ||  || — || November 10, 2006 || Kitt Peak || Spacewatch || KOR || align=right | 1.5 km || 
|-id=887 bgcolor=#d6d6d6
| 292887 ||  || — || November 10, 2006 || Kitt Peak || Spacewatch || EOS || align=right | 2.7 km || 
|-id=888 bgcolor=#d6d6d6
| 292888 ||  || — || November 10, 2006 || Kitt Peak || Spacewatch || — || align=right | 5.2 km || 
|-id=889 bgcolor=#d6d6d6
| 292889 ||  || — || November 11, 2006 || Kitt Peak || Spacewatch || VER || align=right | 4.0 km || 
|-id=890 bgcolor=#d6d6d6
| 292890 ||  || — || November 11, 2006 || Mount Lemmon || Mount Lemmon Survey || THM || align=right | 2.9 km || 
|-id=891 bgcolor=#E9E9E9
| 292891 ||  || — || November 11, 2006 || Catalina || CSS || — || align=right | 3.2 km || 
|-id=892 bgcolor=#fefefe
| 292892 ||  || — || November 11, 2006 || Mount Lemmon || Mount Lemmon Survey || V || align=right data-sort-value="0.53" | 530 m || 
|-id=893 bgcolor=#fefefe
| 292893 ||  || — || November 11, 2006 || Catalina || CSS || NYS || align=right data-sort-value="0.80" | 800 m || 
|-id=894 bgcolor=#fefefe
| 292894 ||  || — || November 12, 2006 || Mount Lemmon || Mount Lemmon Survey || — || align=right data-sort-value="0.74" | 740 m || 
|-id=895 bgcolor=#fefefe
| 292895 ||  || — || November 12, 2006 || Mount Lemmon || Mount Lemmon Survey || NYS || align=right data-sort-value="0.68" | 680 m || 
|-id=896 bgcolor=#E9E9E9
| 292896 ||  || — || November 12, 2006 || Mount Lemmon || Mount Lemmon Survey || — || align=right | 1.3 km || 
|-id=897 bgcolor=#E9E9E9
| 292897 ||  || — || November 12, 2006 || Mount Lemmon || Mount Lemmon Survey || — || align=right | 2.1 km || 
|-id=898 bgcolor=#E9E9E9
| 292898 ||  || — || November 12, 2006 || Mount Lemmon || Mount Lemmon Survey || MIS || align=right | 2.4 km || 
|-id=899 bgcolor=#fefefe
| 292899 ||  || — || November 12, 2006 || Mount Lemmon || Mount Lemmon Survey || MAS || align=right data-sort-value="0.66" | 660 m || 
|-id=900 bgcolor=#fefefe
| 292900 ||  || — || November 12, 2006 || Mount Lemmon || Mount Lemmon Survey || MAS || align=right data-sort-value="0.65" | 650 m || 
|}

292901–293000 

|-bgcolor=#fefefe
| 292901 ||  || — || November 12, 2006 || Mount Lemmon || Mount Lemmon Survey || — || align=right | 1.0 km || 
|-id=902 bgcolor=#E9E9E9
| 292902 ||  || — || November 13, 2006 || Catalina || CSS || — || align=right | 4.2 km || 
|-id=903 bgcolor=#fefefe
| 292903 ||  || — || November 13, 2006 || Catalina || CSS || H || align=right data-sort-value="0.87" | 870 m || 
|-id=904 bgcolor=#E9E9E9
| 292904 ||  || — || November 9, 2006 || Kitt Peak || Spacewatch || — || align=right | 1.6 km || 
|-id=905 bgcolor=#E9E9E9
| 292905 ||  || — || November 10, 2006 || Socorro || LINEAR || — || align=right | 2.7 km || 
|-id=906 bgcolor=#d6d6d6
| 292906 ||  || — || November 10, 2006 || Kitt Peak || Spacewatch || — || align=right | 3.9 km || 
|-id=907 bgcolor=#fefefe
| 292907 ||  || — || November 10, 2006 || Kitt Peak || Spacewatch || NYS || align=right data-sort-value="0.78" | 780 m || 
|-id=908 bgcolor=#fefefe
| 292908 ||  || — || November 10, 2006 || Kitt Peak || Spacewatch || — || align=right | 1.2 km || 
|-id=909 bgcolor=#E9E9E9
| 292909 ||  || — || November 11, 2006 || Kitt Peak || Spacewatch || — || align=right | 1.6 km || 
|-id=910 bgcolor=#E9E9E9
| 292910 ||  || — || November 11, 2006 || Kitt Peak || Spacewatch || — || align=right | 2.2 km || 
|-id=911 bgcolor=#d6d6d6
| 292911 ||  || — || November 11, 2006 || Kitt Peak || Spacewatch || — || align=right | 2.7 km || 
|-id=912 bgcolor=#d6d6d6
| 292912 ||  || — || November 11, 2006 || Kitt Peak || Spacewatch || — || align=right | 2.8 km || 
|-id=913 bgcolor=#fefefe
| 292913 ||  || — || November 11, 2006 || Kitt Peak || Spacewatch || V || align=right data-sort-value="0.81" | 810 m || 
|-id=914 bgcolor=#E9E9E9
| 292914 ||  || — || November 11, 2006 || Kitt Peak || Spacewatch || — || align=right | 1.6 km || 
|-id=915 bgcolor=#fefefe
| 292915 ||  || — || November 11, 2006 || Mount Lemmon || Mount Lemmon Survey || MAS || align=right data-sort-value="0.73" | 730 m || 
|-id=916 bgcolor=#fefefe
| 292916 ||  || — || November 11, 2006 || Kitt Peak || Spacewatch || — || align=right | 1.1 km || 
|-id=917 bgcolor=#fefefe
| 292917 ||  || — || November 11, 2006 || Kitt Peak || Spacewatch || — || align=right | 1.4 km || 
|-id=918 bgcolor=#E9E9E9
| 292918 ||  || — || November 11, 2006 || Kitt Peak || Spacewatch || — || align=right | 2.0 km || 
|-id=919 bgcolor=#d6d6d6
| 292919 ||  || — || November 11, 2006 || Kitt Peak || Spacewatch || — || align=right | 4.0 km || 
|-id=920 bgcolor=#E9E9E9
| 292920 ||  || — || November 11, 2006 || Kitt Peak || Spacewatch || NEM || align=right | 1.9 km || 
|-id=921 bgcolor=#E9E9E9
| 292921 ||  || — || November 11, 2006 || Kitt Peak || Spacewatch || — || align=right | 2.2 km || 
|-id=922 bgcolor=#d6d6d6
| 292922 ||  || — || November 11, 2006 || Kitt Peak || Spacewatch || KOR || align=right | 1.7 km || 
|-id=923 bgcolor=#fefefe
| 292923 ||  || — || November 11, 2006 || Kitt Peak || Spacewatch || — || align=right data-sort-value="0.64" | 640 m || 
|-id=924 bgcolor=#d6d6d6
| 292924 ||  || — || November 11, 2006 || Kitt Peak || Spacewatch || — || align=right | 3.9 km || 
|-id=925 bgcolor=#fefefe
| 292925 ||  || — || November 11, 2006 || Catalina || CSS || — || align=right data-sort-value="0.99" | 990 m || 
|-id=926 bgcolor=#E9E9E9
| 292926 ||  || — || November 11, 2006 || Catalina || CSS || — || align=right | 2.6 km || 
|-id=927 bgcolor=#d6d6d6
| 292927 ||  || — || November 11, 2006 || Catalina || CSS || — || align=right | 3.5 km || 
|-id=928 bgcolor=#d6d6d6
| 292928 ||  || — || November 11, 2006 || Kitt Peak || Spacewatch || KOR || align=right | 1.7 km || 
|-id=929 bgcolor=#d6d6d6
| 292929 ||  || — || November 11, 2006 || Kitt Peak || Spacewatch || — || align=right | 3.9 km || 
|-id=930 bgcolor=#fefefe
| 292930 ||  || — || November 11, 2006 || Kitt Peak || Spacewatch || NYS || align=right data-sort-value="0.77" | 770 m || 
|-id=931 bgcolor=#E9E9E9
| 292931 ||  || — || November 11, 2006 || Mount Lemmon || Mount Lemmon Survey || — || align=right | 2.4 km || 
|-id=932 bgcolor=#E9E9E9
| 292932 ||  || — || November 11, 2006 || Mount Lemmon || Mount Lemmon Survey || — || align=right | 3.2 km || 
|-id=933 bgcolor=#E9E9E9
| 292933 ||  || — || November 11, 2006 || Kitt Peak || Spacewatch || — || align=right | 1.4 km || 
|-id=934 bgcolor=#E9E9E9
| 292934 ||  || — || November 11, 2006 || Mount Lemmon || Mount Lemmon Survey || — || align=right | 3.5 km || 
|-id=935 bgcolor=#E9E9E9
| 292935 ||  || — || November 12, 2006 || Mount Lemmon || Mount Lemmon Survey || — || align=right | 2.6 km || 
|-id=936 bgcolor=#E9E9E9
| 292936 ||  || — || November 12, 2006 || Mount Lemmon || Mount Lemmon Survey || HEN || align=right | 1.3 km || 
|-id=937 bgcolor=#E9E9E9
| 292937 ||  || — || November 12, 2006 || Mount Lemmon || Mount Lemmon Survey || NEM || align=right | 2.3 km || 
|-id=938 bgcolor=#d6d6d6
| 292938 ||  || — || November 12, 2006 || Mount Lemmon || Mount Lemmon Survey || — || align=right | 4.6 km || 
|-id=939 bgcolor=#d6d6d6
| 292939 ||  || — || November 12, 2006 || Mount Lemmon || Mount Lemmon Survey || — || align=right | 3.7 km || 
|-id=940 bgcolor=#d6d6d6
| 292940 ||  || — || November 13, 2006 || Mount Lemmon || Mount Lemmon Survey || — || align=right | 4.0 km || 
|-id=941 bgcolor=#E9E9E9
| 292941 ||  || — || November 13, 2006 || Mount Lemmon || Mount Lemmon Survey || — || align=right | 2.6 km || 
|-id=942 bgcolor=#fefefe
| 292942 ||  || — || November 14, 2006 || Kitt Peak || Spacewatch || — || align=right data-sort-value="0.72" | 720 m || 
|-id=943 bgcolor=#E9E9E9
| 292943 ||  || — || November 14, 2006 || Kitt Peak || Spacewatch || — || align=right | 2.8 km || 
|-id=944 bgcolor=#E9E9E9
| 292944 ||  || — || November 15, 2006 || Mount Lemmon || Mount Lemmon Survey || — || align=right | 1.9 km || 
|-id=945 bgcolor=#E9E9E9
| 292945 ||  || — || November 15, 2006 || Mount Lemmon || Mount Lemmon Survey || — || align=right | 2.3 km || 
|-id=946 bgcolor=#E9E9E9
| 292946 ||  || — || November 10, 2006 || Kitt Peak || Spacewatch || — || align=right | 1.6 km || 
|-id=947 bgcolor=#E9E9E9
| 292947 ||  || — || November 11, 2006 || Kitt Peak || Spacewatch || — || align=right | 2.5 km || 
|-id=948 bgcolor=#fefefe
| 292948 ||  || — || November 11, 2006 || Catalina || CSS || — || align=right data-sort-value="0.66" | 660 m || 
|-id=949 bgcolor=#d6d6d6
| 292949 ||  || — || November 11, 2006 || Catalina || CSS || BRA || align=right | 1.8 km || 
|-id=950 bgcolor=#d6d6d6
| 292950 ||  || — || November 12, 2006 || Lulin || H.-C. Lin, Q.-z. Ye || — || align=right | 3.4 km || 
|-id=951 bgcolor=#d6d6d6
| 292951 ||  || — || November 13, 2006 || Kitt Peak || Spacewatch || — || align=right | 5.1 km || 
|-id=952 bgcolor=#E9E9E9
| 292952 ||  || — || November 13, 2006 || Kitt Peak || Spacewatch || — || align=right | 3.0 km || 
|-id=953 bgcolor=#E9E9E9
| 292953 ||  || — || November 13, 2006 || Palomar || NEAT || — || align=right | 3.5 km || 
|-id=954 bgcolor=#fefefe
| 292954 ||  || — || November 13, 2006 || Kitt Peak || Spacewatch || — || align=right | 1.2 km || 
|-id=955 bgcolor=#d6d6d6
| 292955 ||  || — || November 13, 2006 || Kitt Peak || Spacewatch || HYG || align=right | 2.8 km || 
|-id=956 bgcolor=#E9E9E9
| 292956 ||  || — || November 13, 2006 || Kitt Peak || Spacewatch || — || align=right | 2.3 km || 
|-id=957 bgcolor=#E9E9E9
| 292957 ||  || — || November 13, 2006 || Kitt Peak || Spacewatch || — || align=right | 3.0 km || 
|-id=958 bgcolor=#d6d6d6
| 292958 ||  || — || November 13, 2006 || Kitt Peak || Spacewatch || — || align=right | 3.2 km || 
|-id=959 bgcolor=#E9E9E9
| 292959 ||  || — || November 13, 2006 || Kitt Peak || Spacewatch || PAD || align=right | 2.7 km || 
|-id=960 bgcolor=#fefefe
| 292960 ||  || — || November 13, 2006 || Mount Lemmon || Mount Lemmon Survey || — || align=right data-sort-value="0.96" | 960 m || 
|-id=961 bgcolor=#d6d6d6
| 292961 ||  || — || November 14, 2006 || Mount Lemmon || Mount Lemmon Survey || TEL || align=right | 1.8 km || 
|-id=962 bgcolor=#d6d6d6
| 292962 ||  || — || November 14, 2006 || Kitt Peak || Spacewatch || — || align=right | 3.2 km || 
|-id=963 bgcolor=#fefefe
| 292963 ||  || — || November 14, 2006 || Catalina || CSS || — || align=right | 1.2 km || 
|-id=964 bgcolor=#E9E9E9
| 292964 ||  || — || November 14, 2006 || Kitt Peak || Spacewatch || — || align=right | 1.2 km || 
|-id=965 bgcolor=#d6d6d6
| 292965 ||  || — || November 14, 2006 || Kitt Peak || Spacewatch || — || align=right | 4.3 km || 
|-id=966 bgcolor=#E9E9E9
| 292966 ||  || — || November 15, 2006 || Kitt Peak || Spacewatch || — || align=right | 1.0 km || 
|-id=967 bgcolor=#fefefe
| 292967 ||  || — || November 15, 2006 || Catalina || CSS || ERI || align=right | 1.7 km || 
|-id=968 bgcolor=#E9E9E9
| 292968 ||  || — || November 15, 2006 || Catalina || CSS || — || align=right | 2.3 km || 
|-id=969 bgcolor=#fefefe
| 292969 ||  || — || November 15, 2006 || Kitt Peak || Spacewatch || — || align=right data-sort-value="0.83" | 830 m || 
|-id=970 bgcolor=#d6d6d6
| 292970 ||  || — || November 15, 2006 || Kitt Peak || Spacewatch || — || align=right | 3.5 km || 
|-id=971 bgcolor=#E9E9E9
| 292971 ||  || — || November 15, 2006 || Kitt Peak || Spacewatch || — || align=right | 1.8 km || 
|-id=972 bgcolor=#d6d6d6
| 292972 ||  || — || November 15, 2006 || Kitt Peak || Spacewatch || — || align=right | 3.7 km || 
|-id=973 bgcolor=#E9E9E9
| 292973 ||  || — || November 15, 2006 || Kitt Peak || Spacewatch || — || align=right data-sort-value="0.95" | 950 m || 
|-id=974 bgcolor=#fefefe
| 292974 ||  || — || November 13, 2006 || Kitt Peak || Spacewatch || V || align=right data-sort-value="0.67" | 670 m || 
|-id=975 bgcolor=#fefefe
| 292975 ||  || — || November 13, 2006 || Catalina || CSS || — || align=right data-sort-value="0.85" | 850 m || 
|-id=976 bgcolor=#fefefe
| 292976 ||  || — || November 15, 2006 || Catalina || CSS || FLO || align=right data-sort-value="0.94" | 940 m || 
|-id=977 bgcolor=#E9E9E9
| 292977 ||  || — || November 15, 2006 || Kitt Peak || Spacewatch || XIZ || align=right | 1.3 km || 
|-id=978 bgcolor=#d6d6d6
| 292978 ||  || — || November 2, 2006 || Catalina || CSS || THM || align=right | 2.6 km || 
|-id=979 bgcolor=#d6d6d6
| 292979 ||  || — || November 9, 2006 || Palomar || NEAT || — || align=right | 3.0 km || 
|-id=980 bgcolor=#d6d6d6
| 292980 ||  || — || November 9, 2006 || Palomar || NEAT || — || align=right | 4.4 km || 
|-id=981 bgcolor=#d6d6d6
| 292981 ||  || — || November 9, 2006 || Palomar || NEAT || — || align=right | 3.2 km || 
|-id=982 bgcolor=#E9E9E9
| 292982 ||  || — || November 8, 2006 || Palomar || NEAT || EUN || align=right | 1.4 km || 
|-id=983 bgcolor=#d6d6d6
| 292983 ||  || — || November 15, 2006 || Catalina || CSS || — || align=right | 3.0 km || 
|-id=984 bgcolor=#fefefe
| 292984 ||  || — || November 11, 2006 || Kitt Peak || Spacewatch || NYS || align=right data-sort-value="0.83" | 830 m || 
|-id=985 bgcolor=#d6d6d6
| 292985 ||  || — || November 1, 2006 || Kitt Peak || Spacewatch || KOR || align=right | 1.6 km || 
|-id=986 bgcolor=#fefefe
| 292986 ||  || — || November 8, 2006 || Palomar || NEAT || — || align=right | 1.3 km || 
|-id=987 bgcolor=#E9E9E9
| 292987 ||  || — || November 11, 2006 || Kitt Peak || Spacewatch || HOF || align=right | 2.9 km || 
|-id=988 bgcolor=#d6d6d6
| 292988 ||  || — || November 2, 2006 || Mount Lemmon || Mount Lemmon Survey || EOS || align=right | 2.4 km || 
|-id=989 bgcolor=#E9E9E9
| 292989 ||  || — || November 11, 2006 || Mount Lemmon || Mount Lemmon Survey || — || align=right | 2.4 km || 
|-id=990 bgcolor=#fefefe
| 292990 ||  || — || November 11, 2006 || Mount Lemmon || Mount Lemmon Survey || — || align=right | 1.3 km || 
|-id=991 bgcolor=#E9E9E9
| 292991 Lyonne ||  ||  || November 17, 2006 || Nogales || J.-C. Merlin || HOF || align=right | 3.3 km || 
|-id=992 bgcolor=#E9E9E9
| 292992 ||  || — || November 16, 2006 || Kitt Peak || Spacewatch || — || align=right | 1.4 km || 
|-id=993 bgcolor=#d6d6d6
| 292993 ||  || — || November 16, 2006 || Kitt Peak || Spacewatch || — || align=right | 6.4 km || 
|-id=994 bgcolor=#fefefe
| 292994 ||  || — || November 16, 2006 || Kitt Peak || Spacewatch || — || align=right | 1.1 km || 
|-id=995 bgcolor=#E9E9E9
| 292995 ||  || — || November 16, 2006 || Kitt Peak || Spacewatch || — || align=right | 1.4 km || 
|-id=996 bgcolor=#d6d6d6
| 292996 ||  || — || November 16, 2006 || Socorro || LINEAR || 7:4 || align=right | 3.8 km || 
|-id=997 bgcolor=#E9E9E9
| 292997 ||  || — || November 16, 2006 || Mount Lemmon || Mount Lemmon Survey || EUN || align=right | 1.8 km || 
|-id=998 bgcolor=#fefefe
| 292998 ||  || — || November 17, 2006 || Kitt Peak || Spacewatch || V || align=right data-sort-value="0.85" | 850 m || 
|-id=999 bgcolor=#fefefe
| 292999 ||  || — || November 17, 2006 || Mount Lemmon || Mount Lemmon Survey || NYS || align=right data-sort-value="0.81" | 810 m || 
|-id=000 bgcolor=#E9E9E9
| 293000 ||  || — || November 17, 2006 || Mount Lemmon || Mount Lemmon Survey || AGN || align=right | 1.4 km || 
|}

References

External links 
 Discovery Circumstances: Numbered Minor Planets (290001)–(295000) (IAU Minor Planet Center)

0292